= Coachbuilder =

Maker of bodies for passenger-carrying vehicles

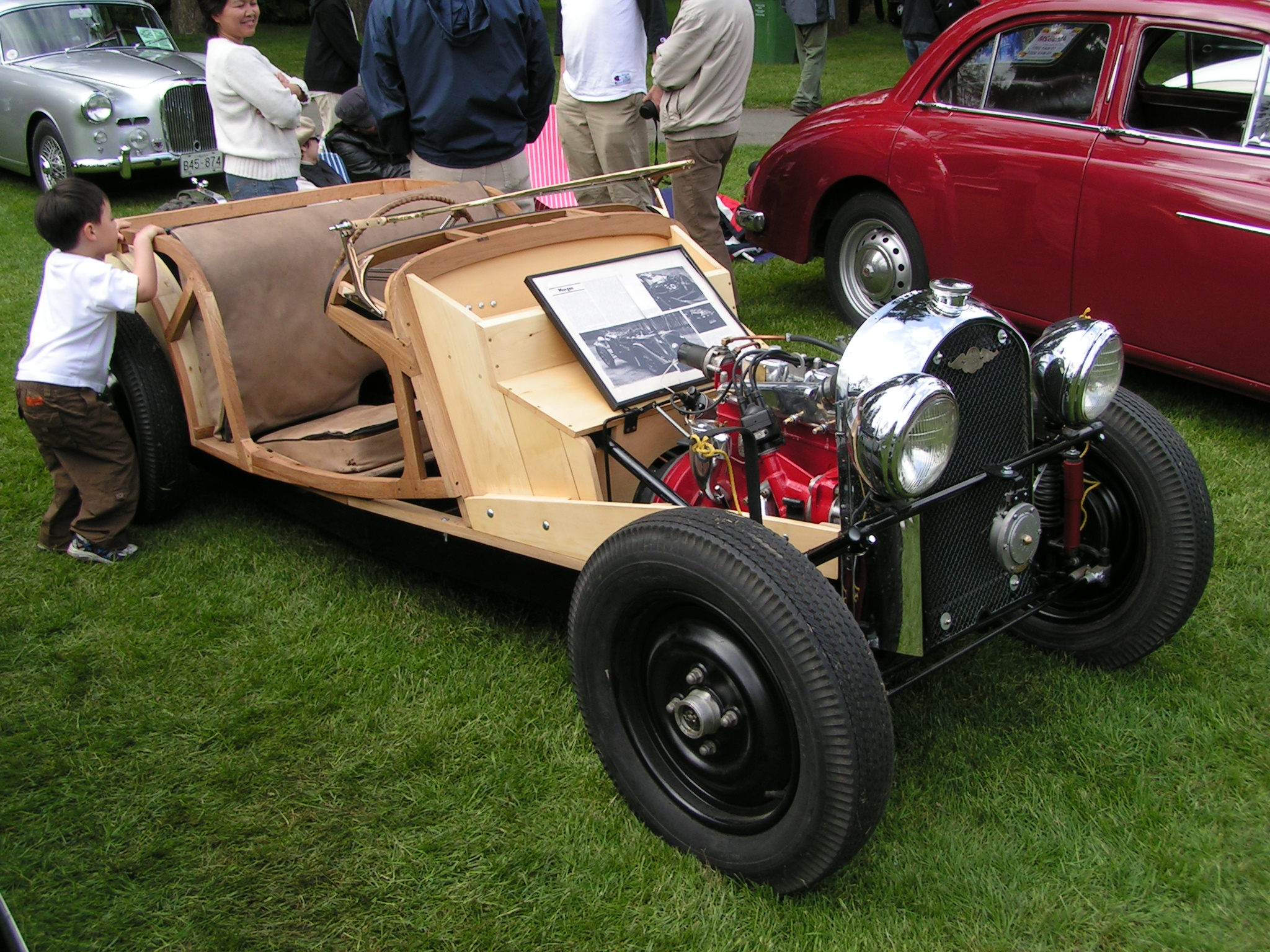
Ash body frame ready to be clad in metal mounted on a Morgan 4/4 chassis

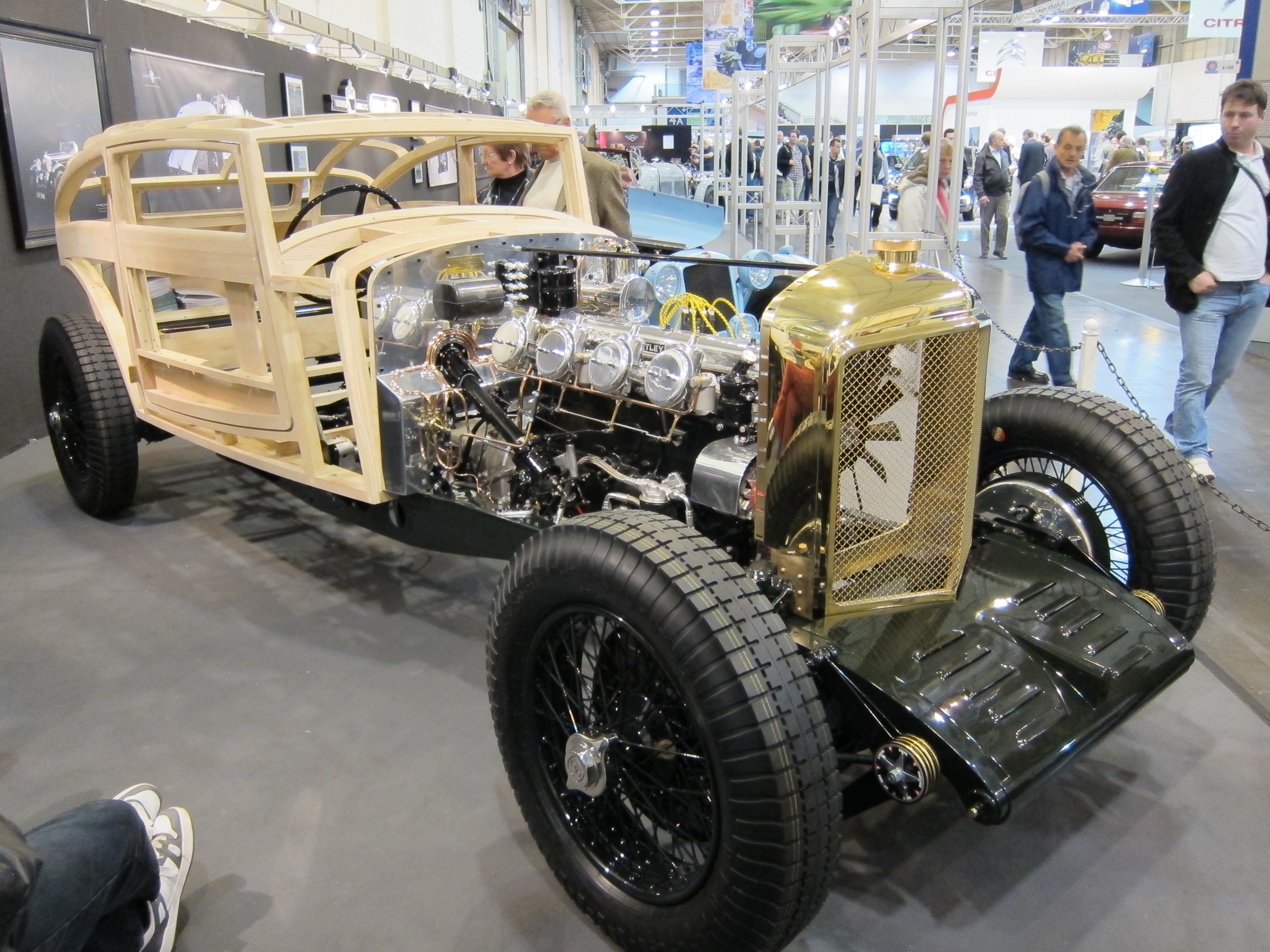
The coachbuilder's wooden frame fixed to its replica Bentley chassis

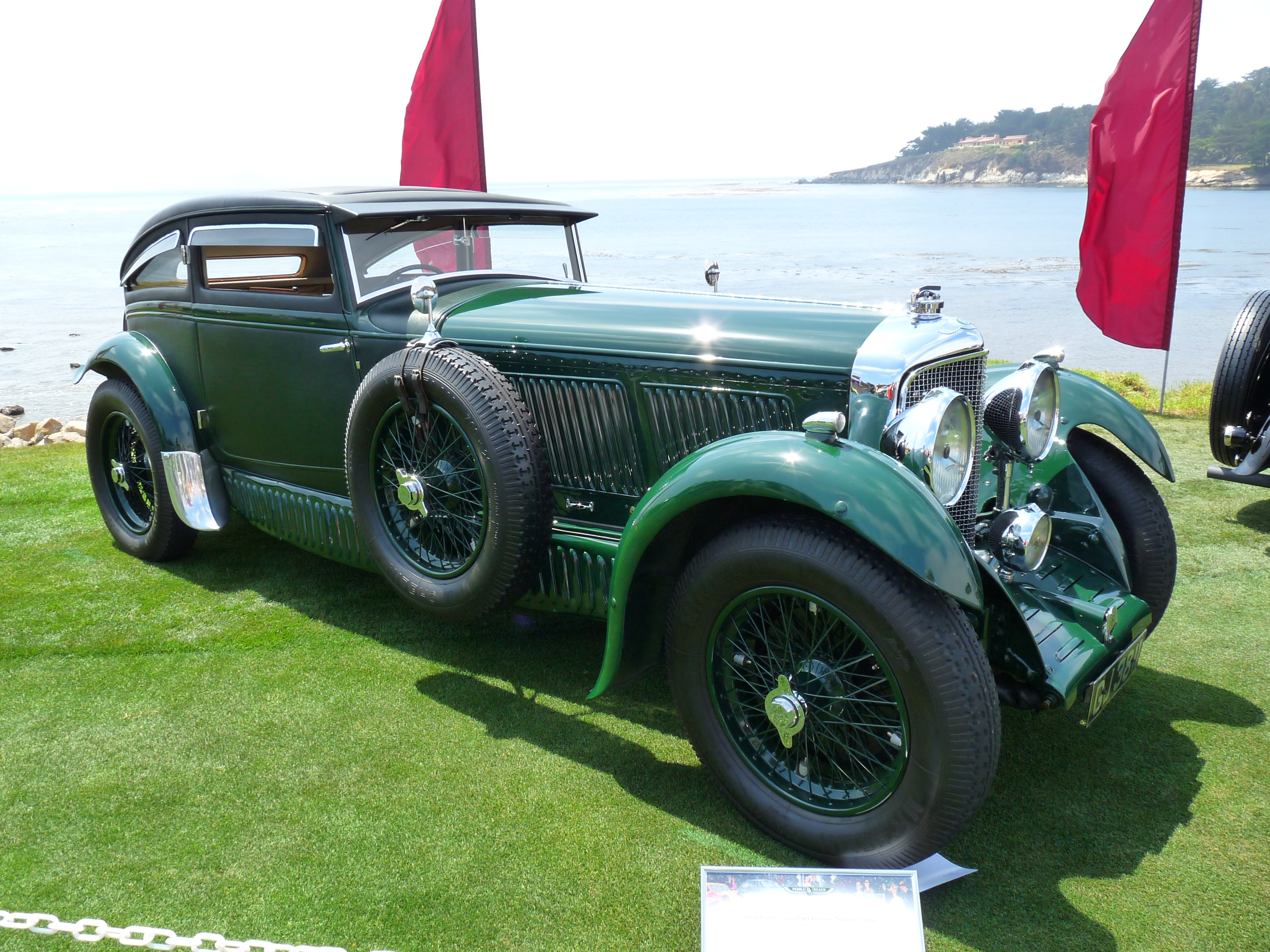
Original 1930 Bentley Speed Six Gurney Nutting coupé

A coachbuilder is a person or organization that manufactures bodies for passenger-carrying vehicles.

The trade of producing coachwork began with bodies for horse-drawn vehicles. Today it includes custom automobiles, buses, motor coaches, and railway carriages.

The word "coach" was derived from the Hungarian town of Kocs. A vehicle body constructed by a coachbuilder may be called a "coachbuilt body" (British English) or "custom body" (American English), and is not to be confused with a custom car.

Prior to the popularization of unibody construction in the 1960s, many independent coachbuilders built bodies on rolling chassis provided by luxury or sports car manufacturers, both for individual customers and makers themselves. Marques such as Ferrari originally outsourced all bodywork to coachbuilders such as Pininfarina and Scaglietti.

Today, the coach building trade has largely shifted to making bodies for short runs of specialized commercial vehicles such as motor coaches and luxury recreational vehicles. A 'conversion' is built inside an existing vehicle body.

Many renowned automotive coachbuilders have been based in Italy (carrozzeria) and France (carrosserie).

== Terminology ==
Construction of specialty vehicle bodies has always been a skilled trade requiring a relatively lightweight product with sufficient strength. The manufacture of necessarily fragile, but satisfactory wheels by a separate trade, a wheelwright, held together by iron or steel tyres, was always most critical.
From about AD 1000 rough vehicle construction was carried out by a wainwright, a wagon-builder. Later names include cartwright (a carpenter who makes carts, from 1587); coachwright; and coachmaker (from 1599). Subtrades include wheelwright, coachjoiner, etc. The word coachbuilder first appeared in 1794.

== Horse-drawn vehicles ==
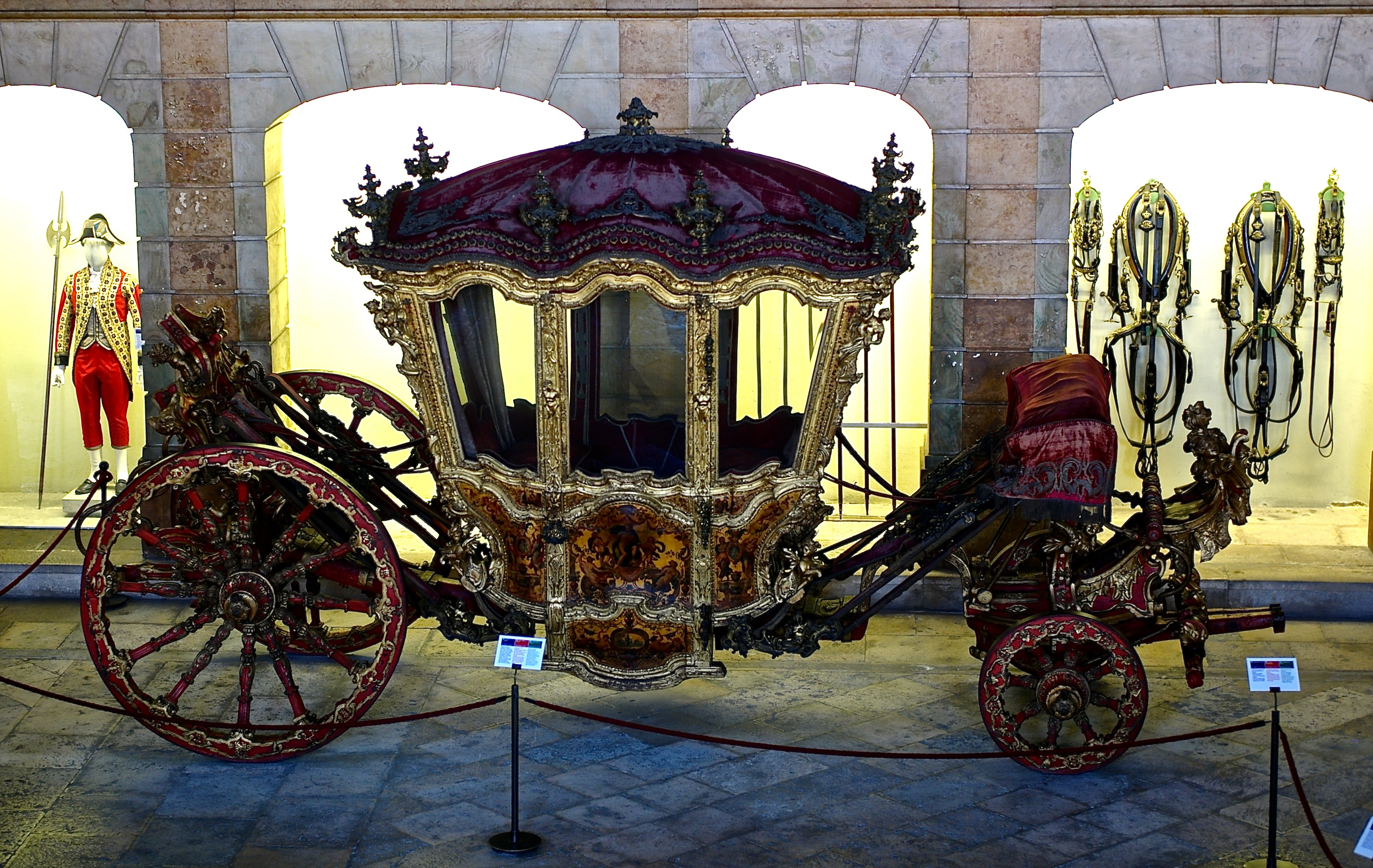
Portugal 18th century

A British trade association the Worshipful Company of Coachmakers and Coach Harness Makers was incorporated in 1630. Some British coachmaking firms operating in the 20th century were established even earlier. Rippon was active in the time of Queen Elizabeth I, Barker founded in 1710 by an officer in Queen Anne's Guards. Brewster, the oldest in the U.S., was formed in 1810.

Coach-building had reached a high degree of specialization in Britain by the middle of the 19th century. Separate branches of the trade dealt with the timber, iron, leather, brass and other materials used in their construction. And there were many minor specialists with each of these categories. The “body-makers” produced the body or vehicle itself, while the “carriage-makers” made the stronger timbers beneath and around the body. The timbers used included ash, beech, elm, oak, mahogany, cedar, pine, birch and larch. The tools and processes used were similar to those used in cabinet-making, plus other specific to coach-making. Making the curved woodwork alone called for considerable skill. Making the iron axles, springs and other metal used was the work of the “coach-smith,” one of the most highly paid classes of London workmen. The coating of the interior of the coach with leather and painting, trimming, and decorating the exterior called for specialist tradesmen with a high degree of skill. Building carts and wagons required similar skills, but of a coarser kind.

== Automobiles ==
From the beginning of the automobile industry, manufacturers offered complete cars assembled in their own factories commonly using entire bodies made by specialist people using different skills. Soon after the start of the twentieth century mass production coachbuilders developed such as Mulliners or Pressed Steel in Great Britain, Fisher Body, Budd, Briggs in the U. S., or Ambi-Budd in Germany. Many other big businesses remain involved.

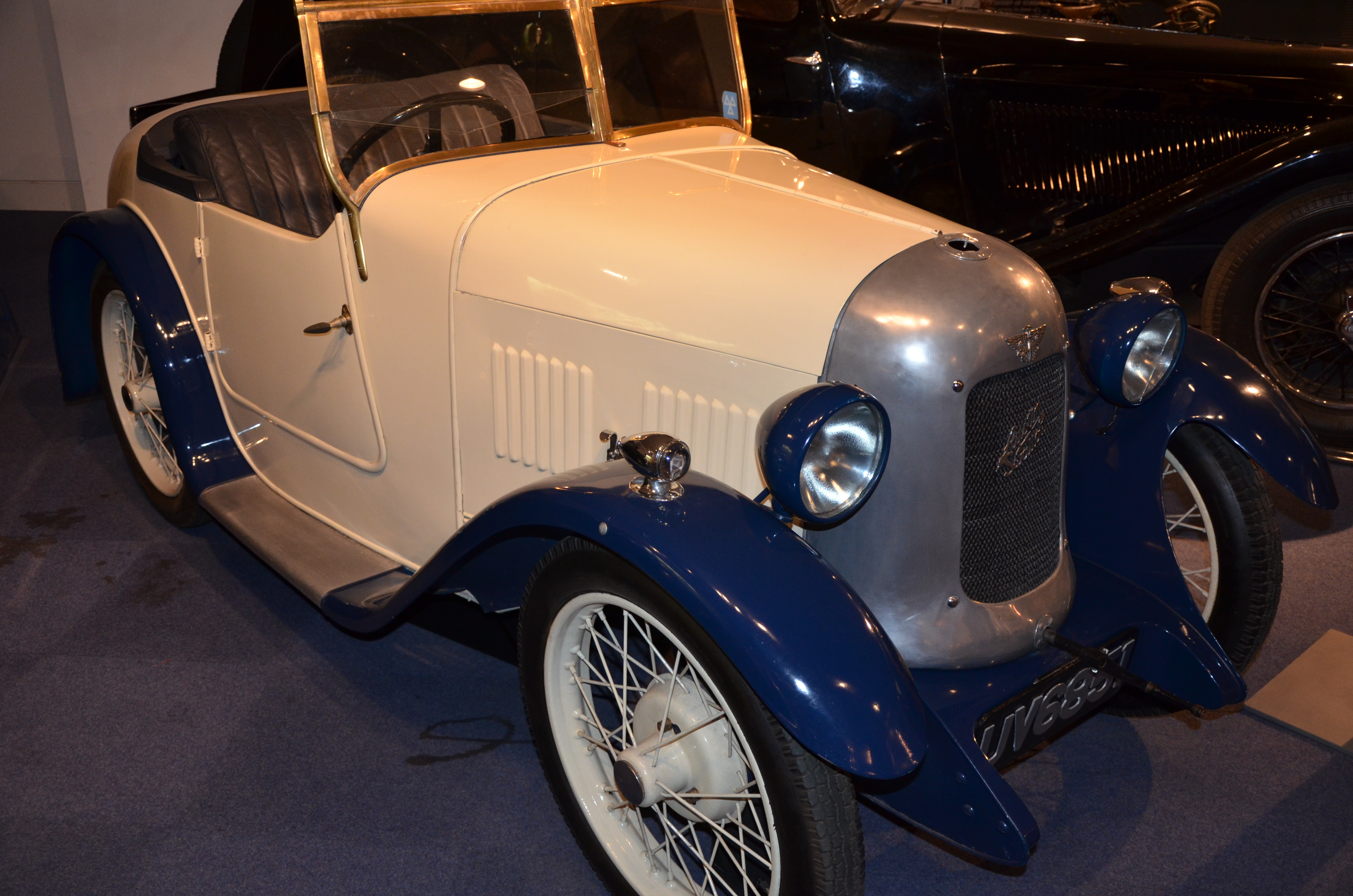
Swallow body on an Austin Seven chassis by Swallow Coachbuilding Company which became Jaguar Cars Many coachbuilt chassis would come with all lights, standard instruments and their panel, engine cover, mudguards and running boards and spare wheel(s)

=== Specialist market sector ===
There remained a market for bodies to fit low production, short-run and luxury cars. Custom or bespoke bodies were made and fitted to another manufacturer's rolling chassis by the craftsmen who had previously built bodies for horse-drawn carriages. Bespoke bodies are made of hand-shaped sheet metal, often aluminum alloy. Pressed or hand-shaped metal panels were fastened to a wooden frame of particularly light but strong types of wood. Later many of the more important structural features of the bespoke or custom body such as A, B and C pillars were cast alloy components. Some bodies such as those entirely alloy bodies fitted to some Pierce-Arrow cars contained little or no wood, and were mounted on a conventional steel chassis.

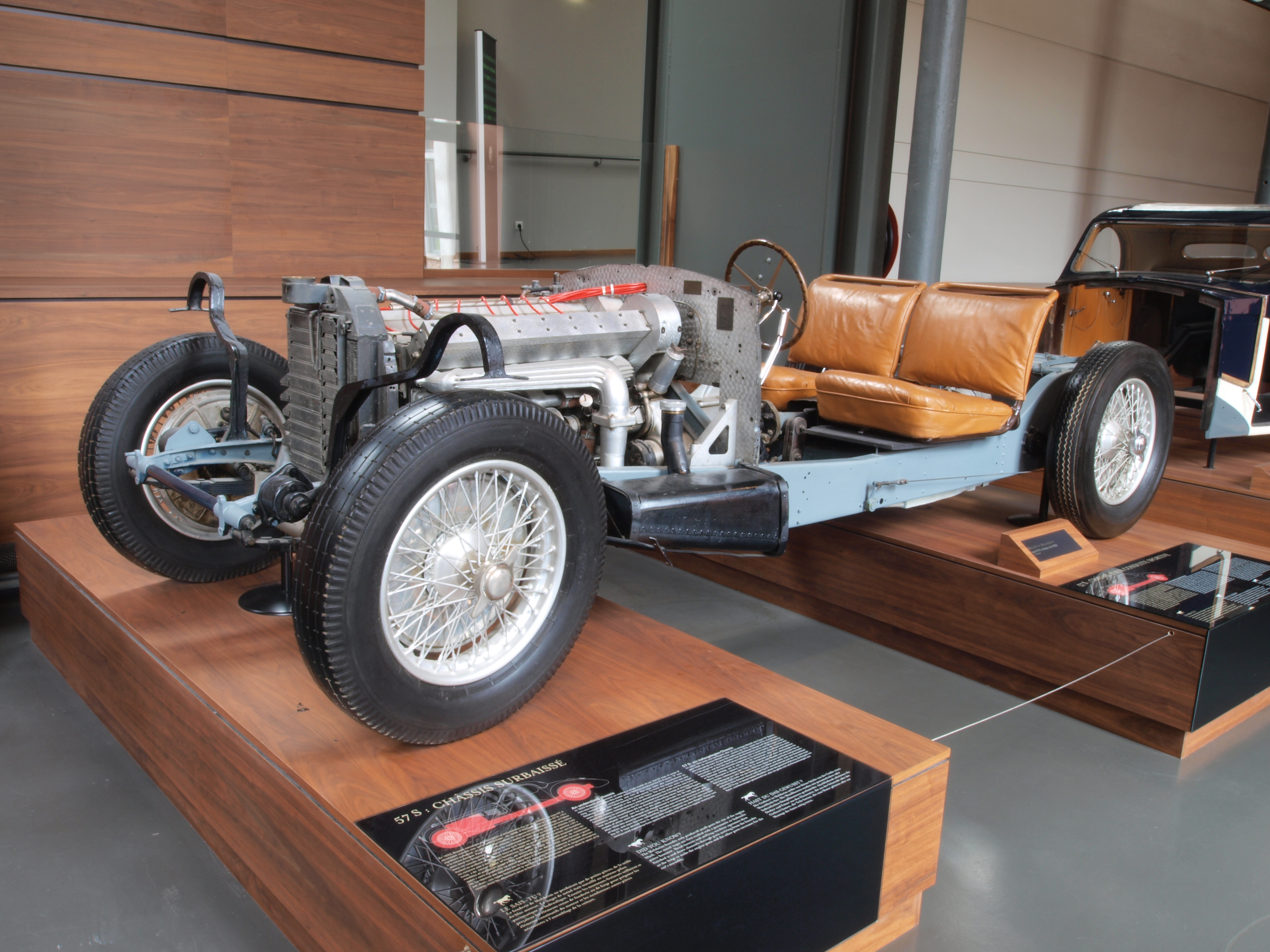
Bugatti Type 57 rolling chassis

The car manufacturer would offer for sale a chassis frame, drivetrain (consisting of an engine, gearbox, differential, axles, and wheels), brakes, suspension, steering system, lighting system, spare wheel(s), front and rear mudguards (vulnerable and so made of pressed steel for strength and easy repair) and (later) bumpers, scuttle (firewall) and dashboard. The very easily damaged honeycomb radiator, later enclosed and protected by a shell or even reduced to an air intake, was or held the visual element identifying the chassis' brand. To let car manufacturers maintain some level of control over the final product their warranties could be voided if coachbuilders fitted unapproved bodies.

As well as bespoke bodies the same coachbuilders also made short runs of more-or-less identical bodies to the order of dealers or the manufacturer of a chassis. The same body design might then be adjusted to suit different brands of chassis. Examples include Salmons & Sons' Tickford bodies with a patent device to raise or lower a convertible's roof, first used on their 19th-century carriages, or Wingham convertible bodies by Martin Walter.

=== Ultra-luxury vehicles ===
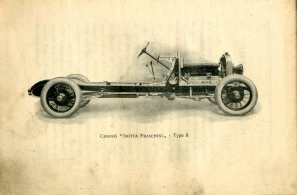
1920 Isotta Fraschini Tipo 8 was only available from the manufacturer as a rolling chassis

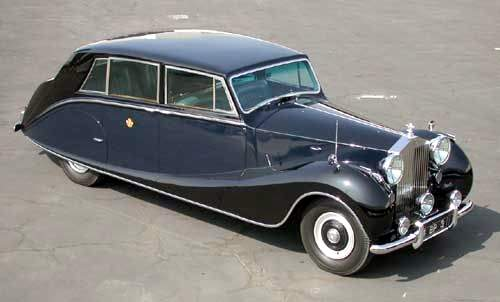
Hooper 7-seater touring limousine for HRH The Prince Regent of Iraq (1953). Rolls-Royce built only 18 Phantom IV chassis for bodies by independent coachbuilders

Larger car dealers or distributors would commonly preorder stock chassis and the bodies they thought most likely to sell and order them for sale off their showroom floor.

All luxury vehicles during the automobile's Golden Era before World War II were available as chassis only. For example, when Duesenberg introduced their Model J, it was offered as chassis only, for $8,500. Other examples include the Bugatti Type 57, Cadillac V-16, Packard Twelve, Ferrari 250, Isotta Fraschini Tipo 8, Hispano-Suiza J12, and all Rolls-Royces produced before World War II. Delahaye had no in-house coachworks, so all its chassis were bodied by independents, who created their designs on the Type 135. For the Delahaye, most were bodied by Chapron, Labourdette, Franay, Saoutchik, Figoni et Falaschi, or Pennock.

The practice continued after World War II waning dramatically in the 1950s and 1960s. Rolls-Royce debuted its first unibody model, their Silver Shadow, in 1965.

=== Obsolescence ===
Separate coachbuilt bodies became obsolete when vehicle manufacturers found they could no longer meet their customers' demands by relying on a simple separate rolling chassis (on which a custom body could be built). Unibody or monocoque combined chassis and body structures began to become standardised past the midpoint of the 20th century to enhance rigidity to meet the demands of improved suspension systems, reduce weight, increase gas mileage, and importantly reduce manufacturing costs.

Independent coachbuilders survived for a time after the mid-20th century, making bodies for rolling chassis provided by low-production companies such as Rolls-Royce, Ferrari, and Bentley. Producing metal body dies is extremely expensive (a single door die can run to US$40,000), which is usually only considered practical in large-scale mass production—though that was the path taken by Rolls-Royce and Bentley after 1945 for their own in-house body-on-frame production. Because dies for pressing metal panels are so costly, from the mid 20th century, many vehicles, most notably the Chevrolet Corvette, were constructed out of fiberglass-reinforced resin, which only require inexpensive molds made of any suitable materials that can stand the application of lightweight pliable materials in their uncured state, not stand up to the stress of being struck in a metal press. When cost is not a major consideration and weight-saving is of paramount importance, fiberglass has since been replaced by newer materials such as carbon fiber, if necessary hand-formed.

=== Unibody construction ===
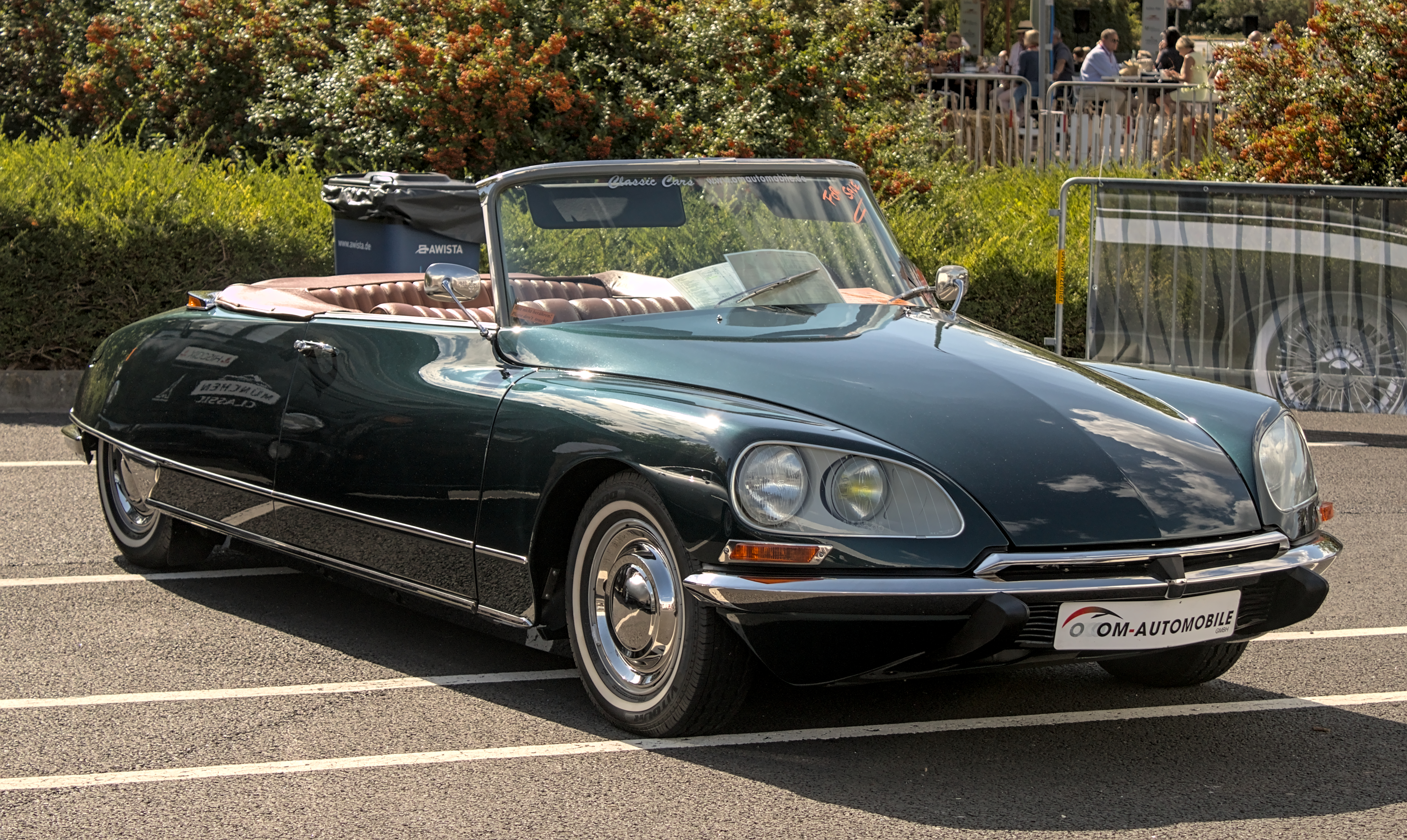
Decapotable (convertible) by Henri Chapron on a Citroen DS chassis 1967

The advent of unibody construction, where the car body is unified with and structurally integral to the chassis, made custom coachbuilding uneconomic. Many coachbuilders closed down, were bought by manufacturers, or changed their core business to other activities:

- Transforming into dedicated design or styling houses, subcontracting to automotive brands (e.g. Zagato, Frua, Bertone, Pininfarina)
- Transforming into general coachwork series manufacturers, subcontracting to automotive brands (e.g. Karmann, Bertone, Vignale, Pininfarina)
- Manufacturing runs of special coachworks for trucks, delivery vans, touring cars, ambulances, fire engines, public transport vehicles, etc. (e.g., Pennock, Van Hool, Plaxton, Heuliez)
- Becoming technical partners for the development of roof constructions (e.g., Karmann, Heuliez), for example, or producers of various (aftermarket) automotive parts (e.g., Giannini)

=== Gallery ===
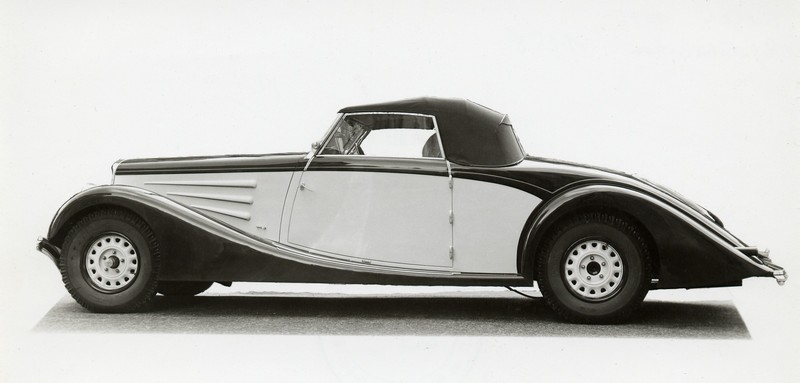
Pourtout drophead coupé on a Lancia Belna chassis 1935

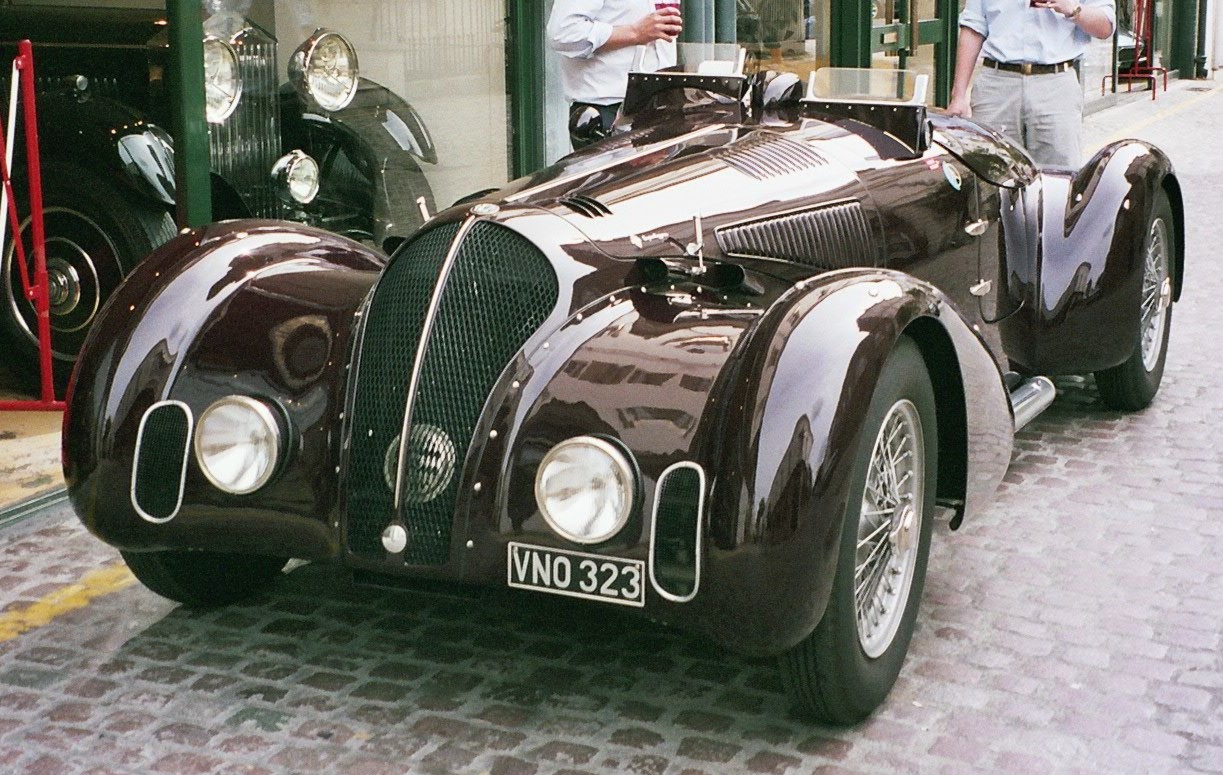
Touring 2-seater body on a 1938 Alfa Romeo 6C 2300B chassis

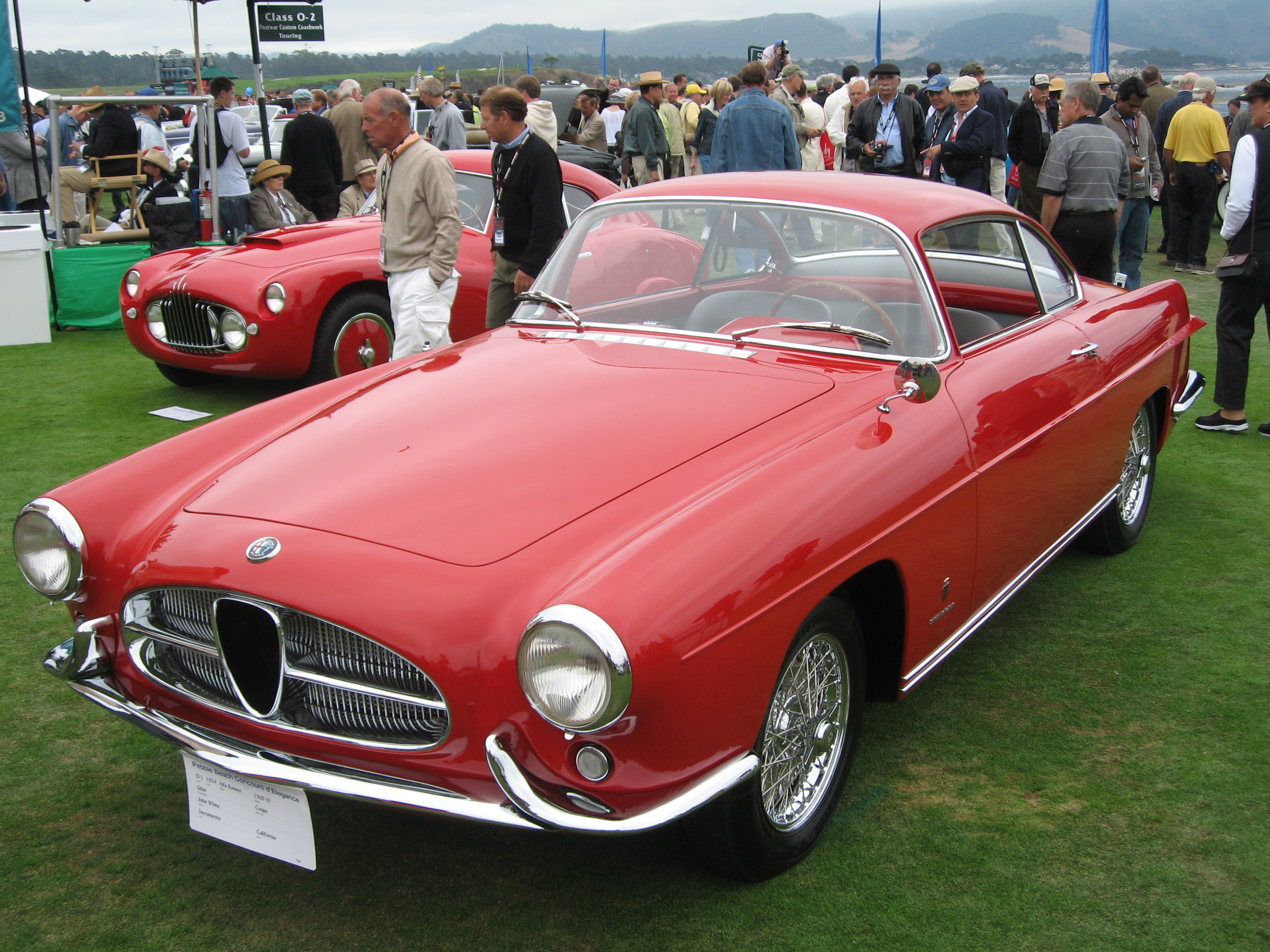
Fixed head coupé by Ghia 1954 on an Alfa Romeo 1900 SS chassis

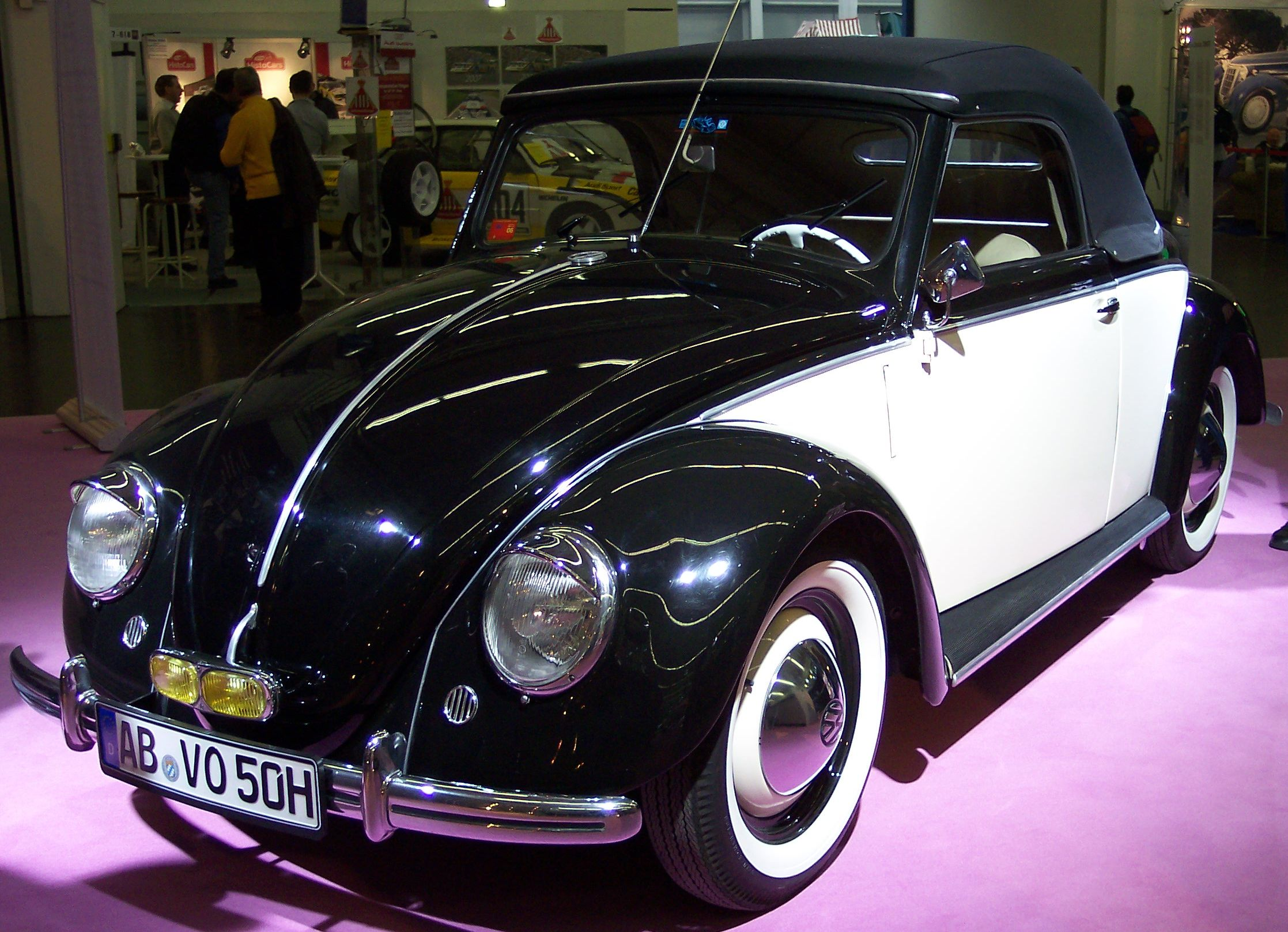
Hebmüller Cabriolet modifications upon a mass-produced Volkswagen platform chassis

== List of automobile coachbuilders ==
=== Austria ===
- Jauernig
- Rohrbacher
- Weiser & Sohn

=== Belgium ===
- Jacques Coune
- D'Ieteren
- Jonckheere
- Vanden Plas
- Van Hool
- Vesters & Neirinck

=== China ===
- The Auto Palace Co (Shanghai)
- The Shanghai Horse Bazaar and Motor Company Limited (Shanghai)

=== Czech Republic ===
- Karosa
- Sodomka

=== France ===
- Antem
- Autobineau
- Belvallette Frères
- Billeter & Cartier
- Chappe et Gessalin
- Chapron
- Philippe Charbonneaux
- Chausson
- Darl'mat
- Facel-Métallon
- Fernandez & Darrin
- Figoni et Falaschi
- Franay
- Gaston Grümmer
- Heuliez
- Hibbard & Darrin
- Lamberet
- Letourneur et Marchand
- Million-Guiet
- Pourtout
- Saoutchik
- Vanvooren
- Weymann

=== Germany ===
- Ambi-Budd
- Auer
- Autenrieth
- Baur
- Binz
- Dannenhauer & Stauss
- Deutsch
- Dörr & Schreck
- Drauze
- Erdmann & Rossi
- Gläser
- Hebmüller
- Ihle
- Kässbohrer
- Karmann
- Keinath
- Kellner
- Kruse
- Kühlstein
- Kühn
- Neoplan
- Reutter
- Rometsch
- Setra
- Styling Garage
- Wendler

=== India ===
- DC Design

=== Ireland ===
- O'Gorman

=== Italy ===
- Ala d'Oro
- Alessio
- Allemano
- Autodromo
- Bertone
- Bizzarrini
- Boano
- Boneschi
- Caselani
- Castagna
- Cecomp
- Coggiola
- Colli
- Coriasco
- De Simon
- Farina
- Fioravanti
- Fissore
- Frua
- Garavini
- Ghia
- Ghia-Aigle
- Giannini
- Giugiaro
- I.DE.A
- Italdesign
- Lombardi
- Maggiora
- Marazzi
- MAT
- Meade
- Morelli
- Motto
- Nembo
- OSI
- Pavesi
- Pininfarina
- Sala
- Scaglietti
- Sports Cars (Drogo)
- Stola
- Studiotorino
- Touring
- Varesina
- Vignale
- Viotti
- Zagato

=== Japan ===
- Mitsuoka

=== Netherlands ===
- Bij 't Vuur
- Pennock
- Spyker
- Vandenbrink Design

=== Poland ===
- Plage i Laśkiewicz

=== Spain ===
- Abadal
- Ayats
- Irizar

=== Switzerland ===
- Beutler
- C. & R. Geissberger
- Graber
- Ramseier
- Worblaufen

=== United Kingdom ===
- Abbey Coachworks (aka Wingham Martin Walter)
- Abbott
- Alexander Dennis (formerly Walter Alexander Coachbuilders)
- Arthur Mulliner
- Aston Martin
- Atcherley
- Barker
- Broom
- Butlin
- Cann
- Carbodies
- Carlton
- Crayford Engineering
- Charlesworth
- Corsica
- Croall
- Cunard
- Gordon England
- Freestone and Webb
- Grose
- Harold Radford
- Harrington
- Hooper
- Hoyal
- H. J. Mulliner & Co.
- J Gurney Nutting & Co
- James Young
- Jones Brothers
- Jarvis of Wimbledon
- Jensen
- Lancefield
- Martin Walter
- Mulliner Park Ward
- Mulliners
- New Avon
- Nu-Track
- Optare
- Park Ward
- Rippon Bros
- Salmons
- Swallow
- Tickford
- Thrupp & Maberly
- Vanden Plas
- Vince & Son
- Walter Alexander Coachbuilders
- Vincent of Reading
- Windovers
- Wrightbus

=== United States ===
- Abbot-Downing
- Biddle and Smart
- Bohman & Schwartz
- Brewster
- Briggs
- Brunn
- Budd
- Coachcraft
- Darrin of Paris
- Derham
- Dietrich Inc.
- Earl Automobile Works
- Fisher
- Albert Fisher
- Fleetwood
- Holbrook
- Judkins
- LeBaron
- Murphy
- Murray
- Rollson
- Rollston
- Studebaker
- Walker
- Waterhouse
- Willoughby
- Wilson

=== Survivors of the unibody production-line system ===
These are survivors of the unibody production-line system.

- Coway
- Jankel
- Jubilee
- MacNeillie
- Overfinch
- Wilcox
- Woodall-Nicholson

== See also ==
- Bus manufacturing
- Carriage
- Body-on-frame
- Chassis
- Unibody
- Wainwright
