= Vince & Son =

UK business

- Type: Wheeled-transport Specialists
- Industry: Automotive
- Founded: 1868
- Headquarters: Ely, England
- Area served: Worldwide
- Key people: Albert and Peter Vince
- Products: Trucks, buses, car-derived vans

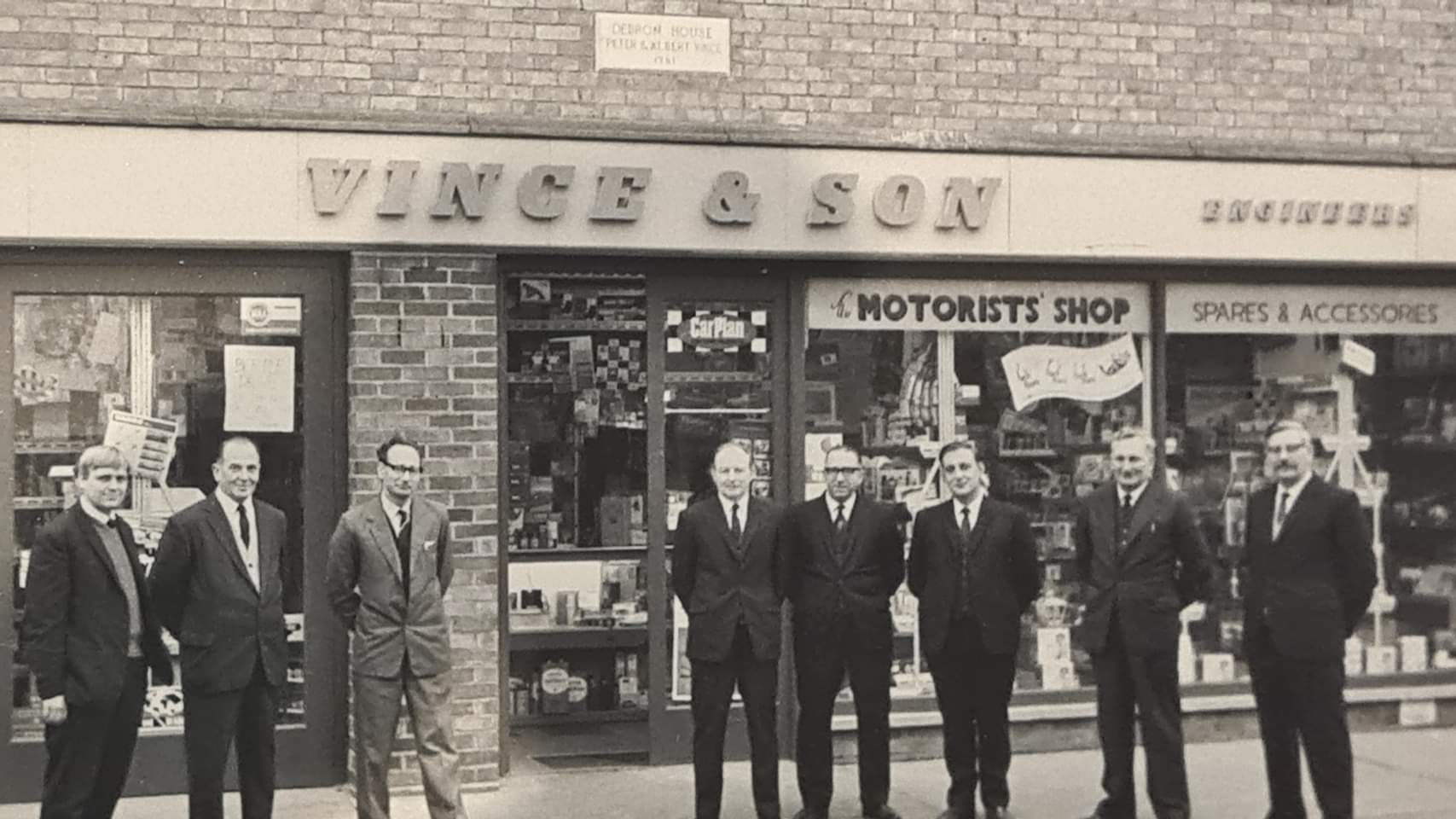

Vince & Son operated for 120 years as wheeled-transport specialists in Ely, Cambridgeshire, England.

== History ==
Founded in Ely as coachbuilders in 1868 by John Orviss Vince (1846–1923), they carried on a local business as constructors of all types of horse-drawn vehicles through to the inter-war period, when they began to include early motor-buses (‘Vince’s Golden Queen’) in their trade. At this time the business had passed on into the hands of J. O. Vince’s son Albert Edward Vince (1885–1954), and after the Second World War, on again to Albert Edward’s sons Peter (1915–1987) and Albert (a.k.a. ‘Bill’, 1920–2004). During this latter period of 40 years, the business became specialists in ex-government vehicles. The surviving brother ‘Bill’ Vince ceased trading as Vince & Son in the late 1980s. In their final incarnation under Peter and Bill’s direction, Vince & Son maintained links with their origins in the title ‘Vince & Son Motor Engineers and Coachbuilders’.

The name 'Vince & Son' was revived in 2010, by descendant Edward Vince, for an art direction and graphic design studio.

== Personnel ==
J. O. Vince, the original ‘Vince’ in the company name, served a teenage apprenticeship which, as well as coach-crafts and blacksmithing with his father in Downham Market, Norfolk, included assistance with the production of Ely Cathedral’s nave ceiling paintings by its Victorian restorers. Each of the three generations of Vince & Son proprietors maintained the craftsman’s side of the coachbuilder’s art: John Orviss had to be able to build a cart from the ground-up and complete its decoration, his son Albert Edward carried on the complex paint-mixing, varnishing, coach-lining and upholstering skills into the motor age, and his sons Peter and Bill retained this knowledge. Bill Vince sold vintage vehicle parts, for about 13 years, up to 2003.
