= Carrosseriefabriek Pennock =

Dutch coachbuilding company

Carrosseriefabriek Pennock, short for Carrosseriefabriek P. J. Pennock & Zonen, was a Dutch coachbuilding company.

== History ==
Johannes Jacobus Pennock founded the company in The Hague in 1884. Another source states 1898. Initially he manufactured carriages. After his death his son Piet (PJ) ran the company.

In 1900, the production of bodies for automobiles and buses began. Customers included FN. From the 1920s, both individual bodies and larger series production of convertibles were produced, mainly based on somewhat more expensive chassis from Buick, Nash, Packard and Studebaker.

In the 1940s, bodies were made for the Story brand electric cars of the Internationale Automobiel Maatschappij. Pennock also built individual bodies on the basis of Alvis, Alfa Romeo, Kaiser, Riley, Healey, Lagonda, Talbot-Lago, Minerva and Škoda chassis'. The Dutch royal family took delivery of an Austin A125 bodied by Pennock, which still exists today.

In 1953 or 1954 the company was dissolved.

== Gallery ==
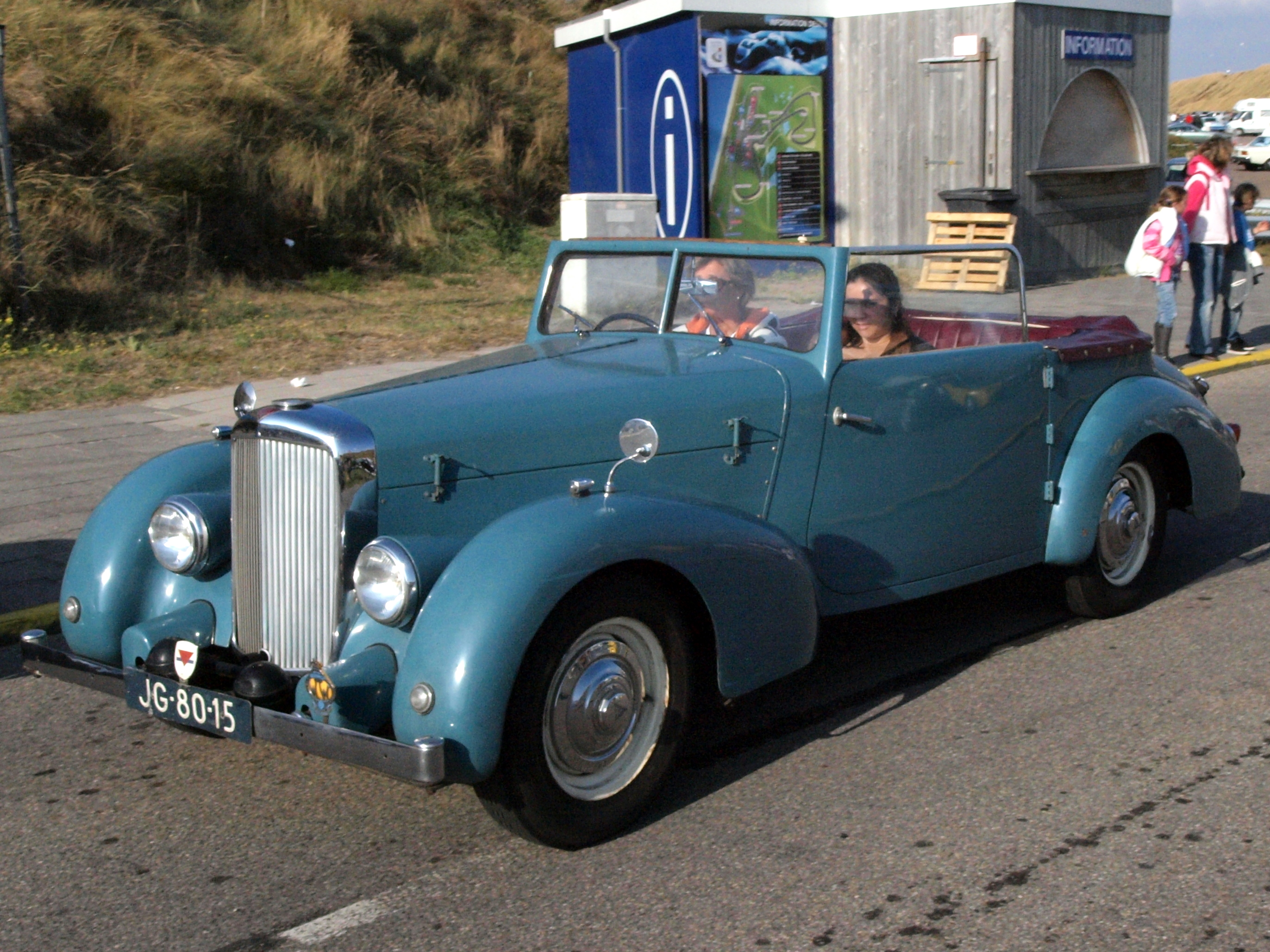
Alvis TA 14 with a cabriolet body by Pennock

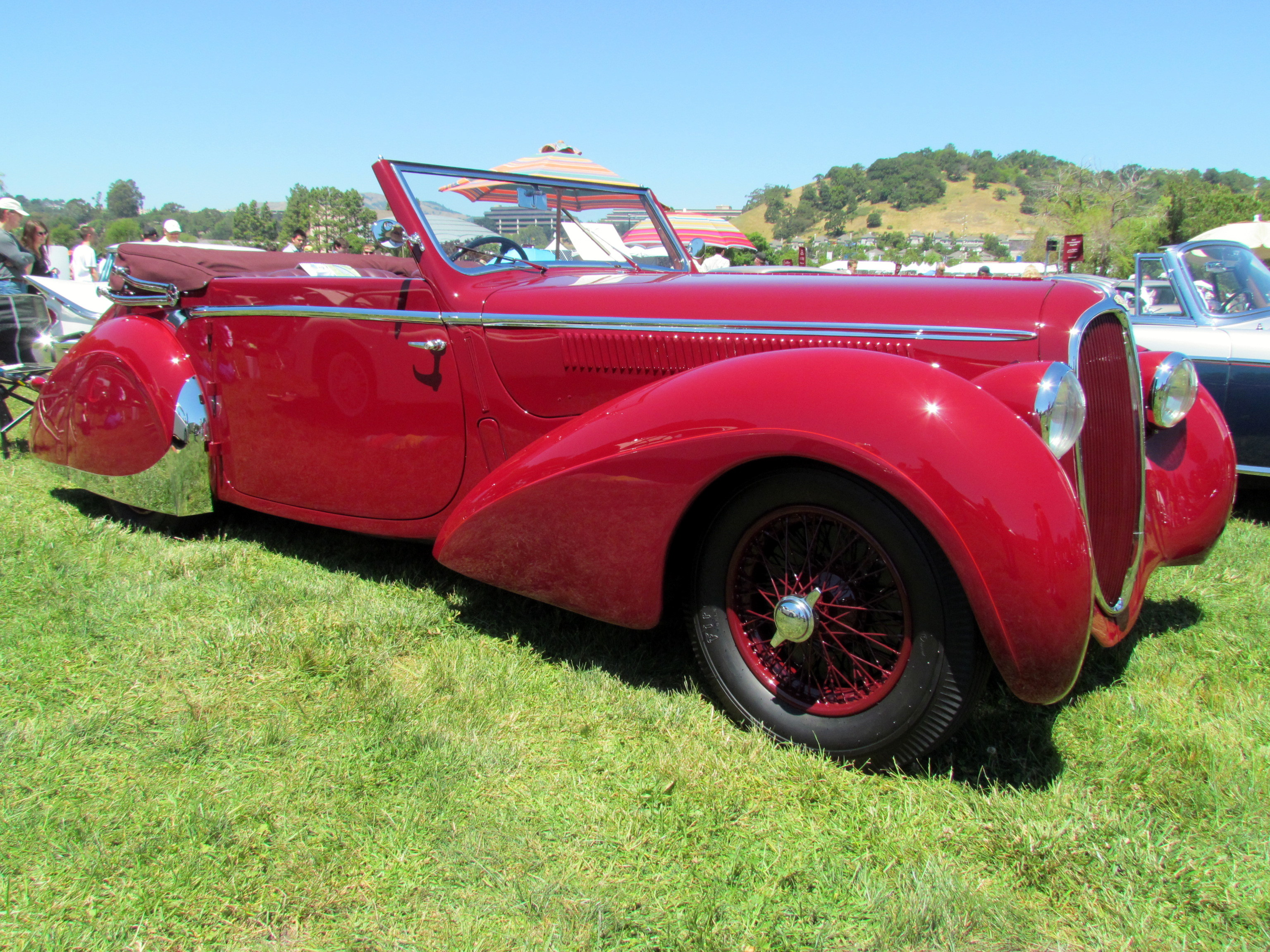
1947 Delahaye 135M Cabriolet bodied by Pennock

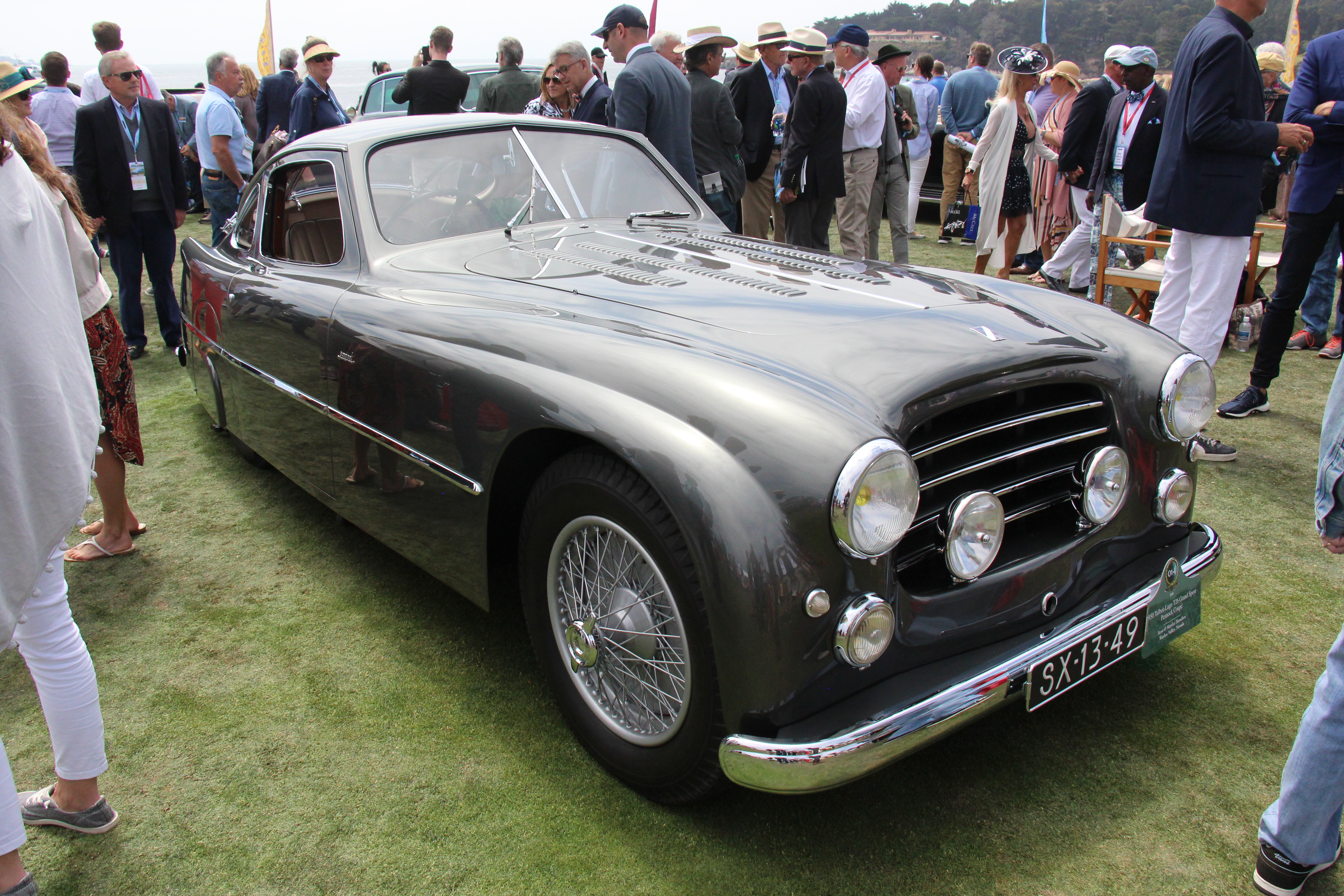
1950 Talbot Lago T26 GS bodied by Pennock

== Literature ==
- George Nicholas Georgano : Routledge, New York 2001, ISBN 978-1-57958-367-5, p. 267–269.
