= O'Gorman Coach Builders =

Irish coach building company

O'Gorman Bros
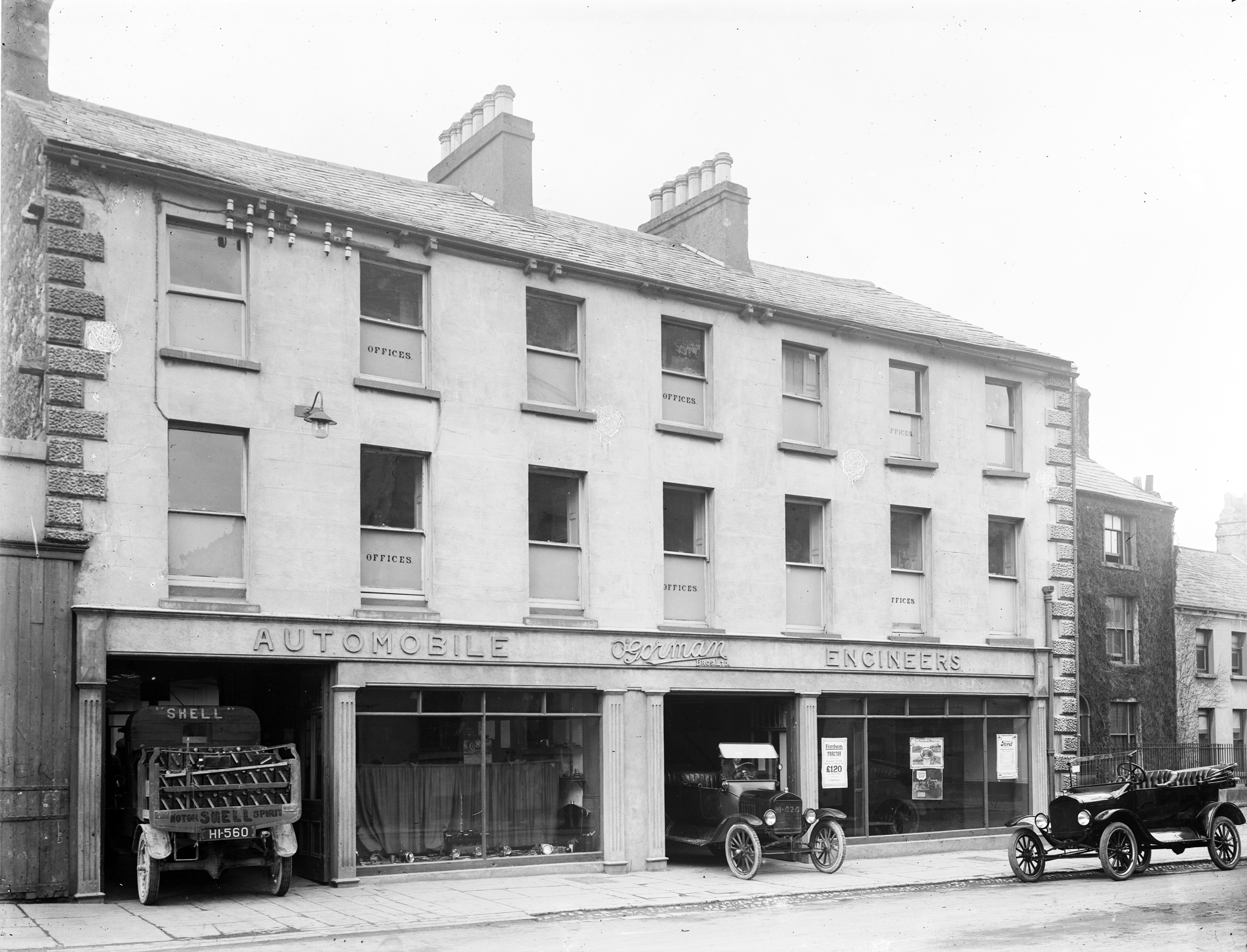
- O'Gorman Brothers Garage in 1922
- Traded as: O'Gorman Bros, O'Gormans, John O'Gorman & Sons, J.F. O'Gorman Ltd.
- Founder: John Francis O'Gorman
- Headquarters: Clonmel, County Tipperary, Ireland
- Products: Coachbuilders and Motor Engineers

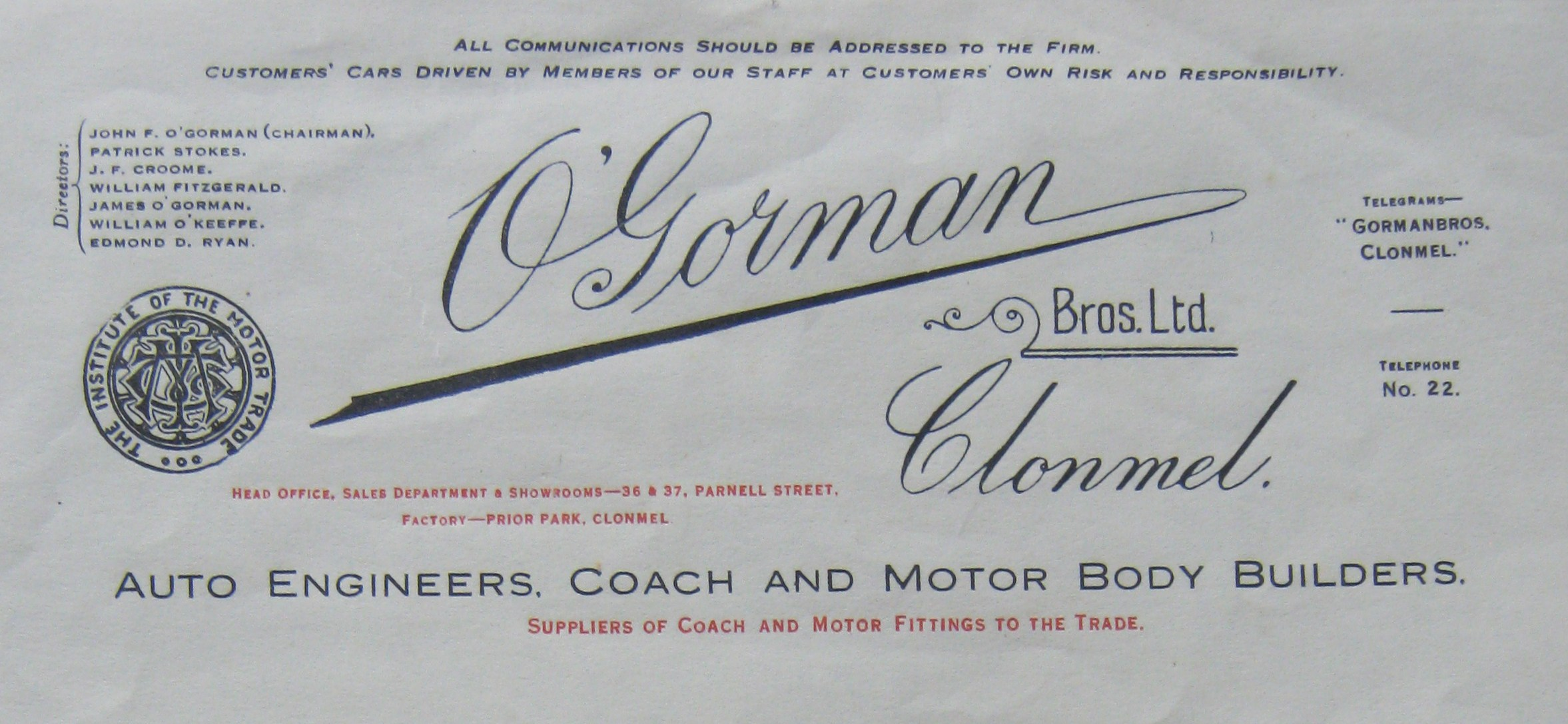
Company headed paper

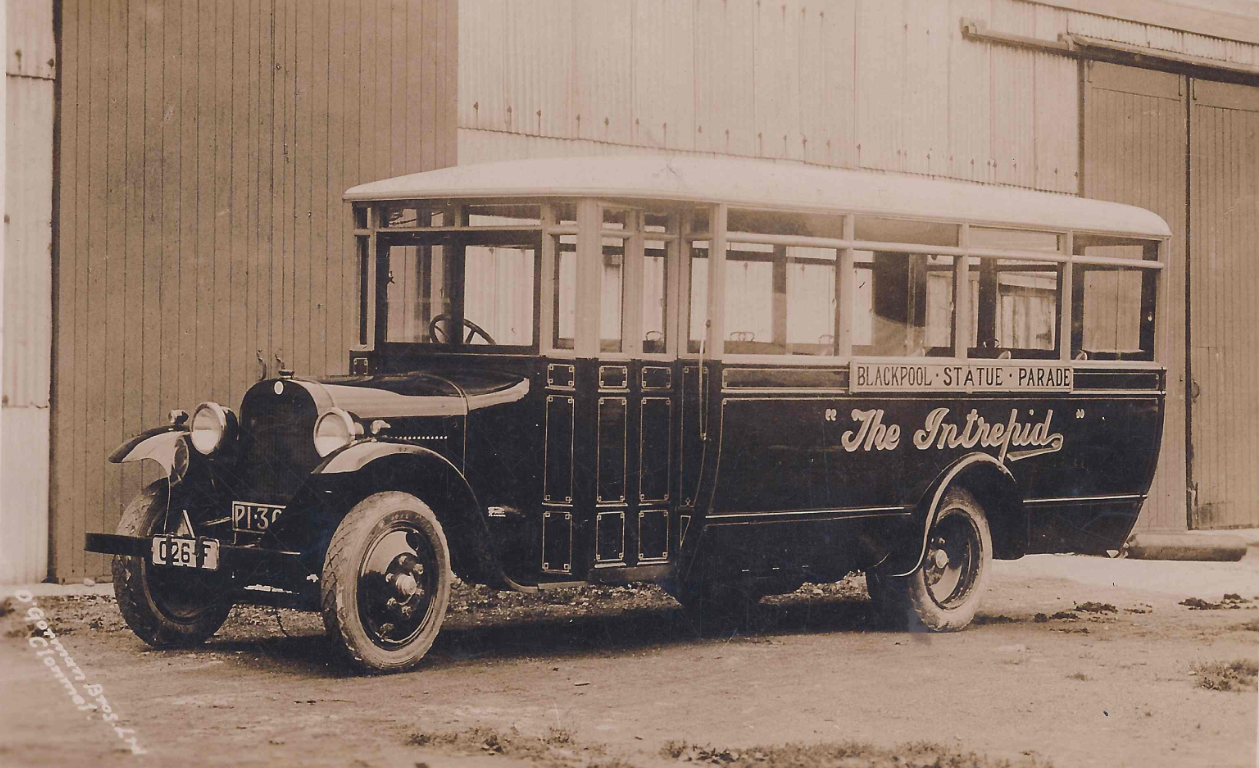
Bodywork by O'Gorman Bros. Ltd

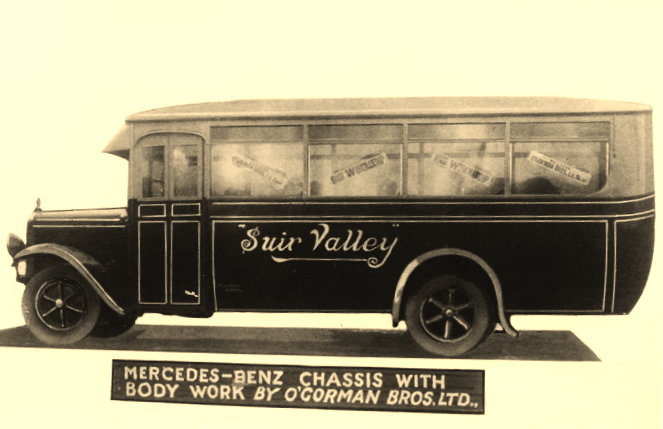
Bodywork by O'Gorman Bros. Ltd

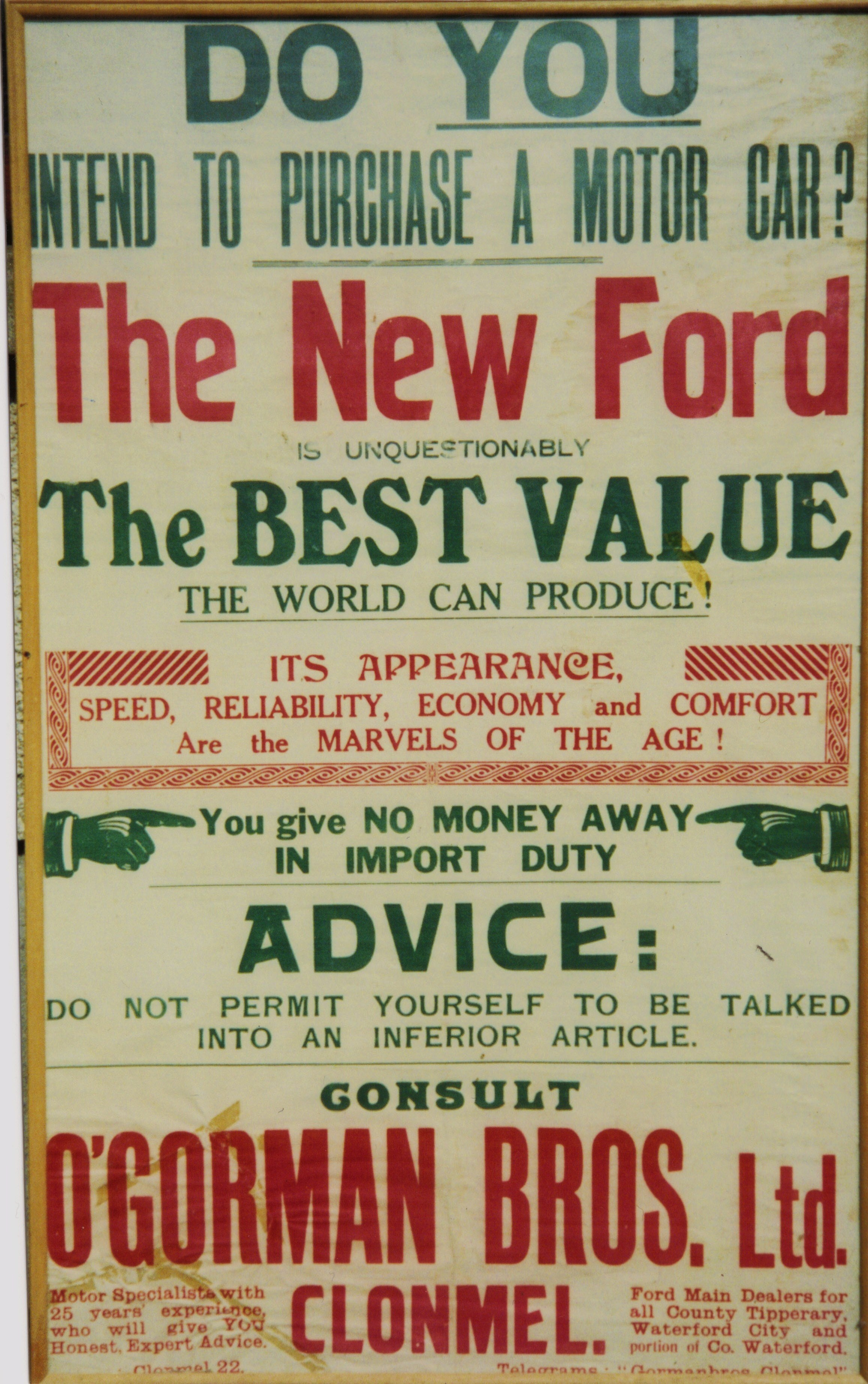
O'Gorman Bros. Ltd Dealership Poster for Ford

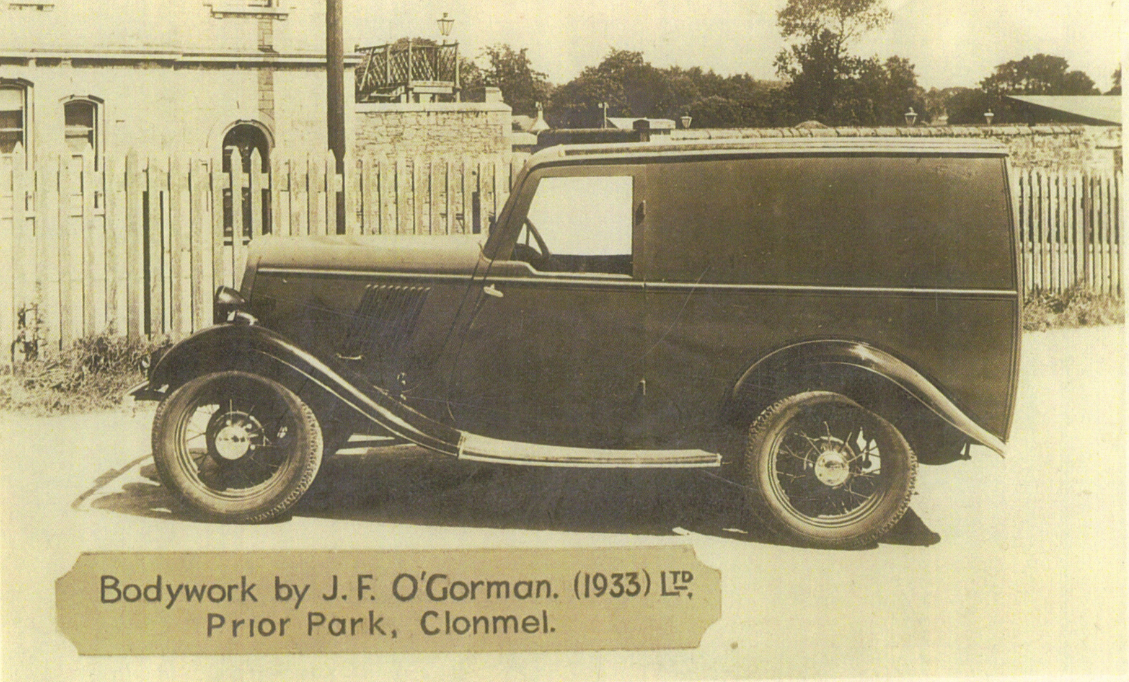
Bodywork by J. F. O'Gorman (1933) Ltd

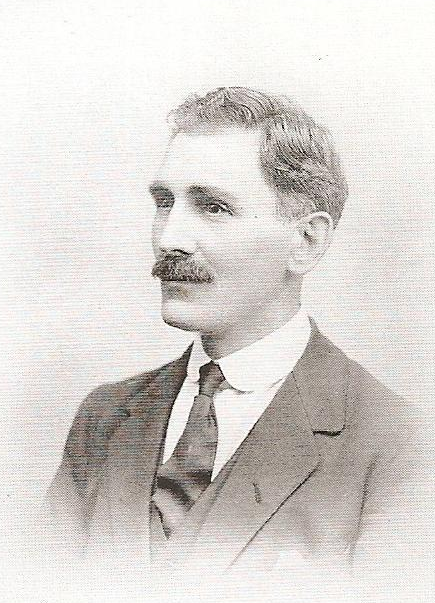
John Francis O'Gorman

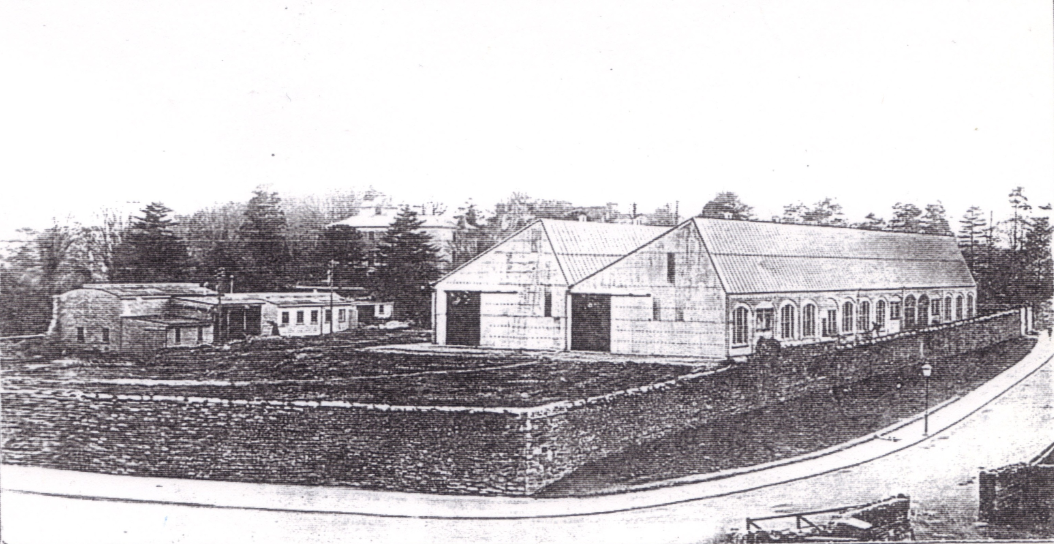
O'Gorman Factory in 1920s with Prior Park house in background

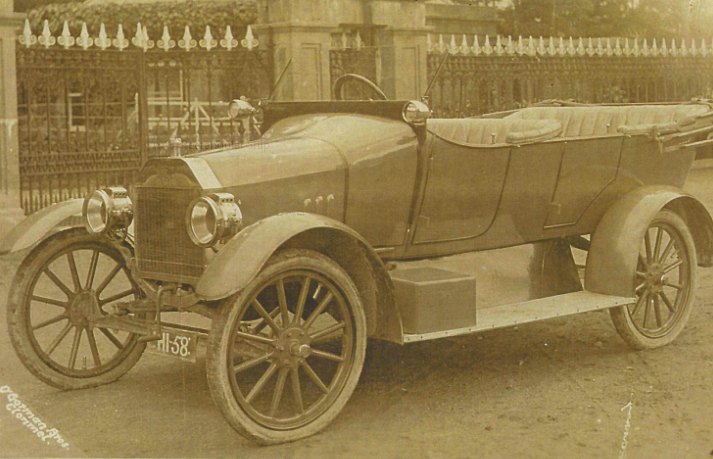
Built by O'Gorman Bros. Ltd

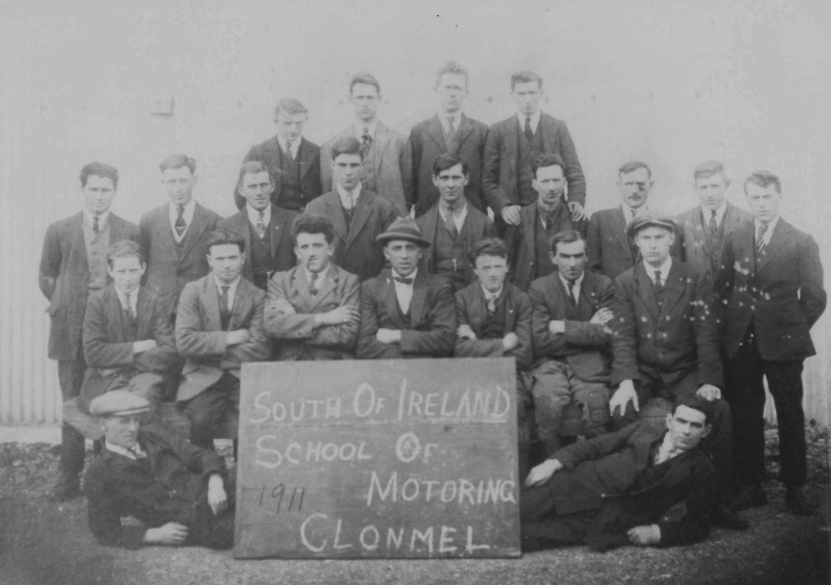
A South of Ireland School of Motoring class, Clonmel. Late 1920s or early 30s

O'Gorman Coachbuilders was an Irish coach building company that traded under various names from the 1920s to the 1940s.

== History ==
John Francis O'Gorman (4 February 1875 – 27 December 1943) and his brother James (6 February 1877 – 23 October 1963) came to Clonmel, County Tipperary, Ireland in 1899, shortly before the death of their father. They worked as apprentices at Cleary's Coachbuilder in Anglesea Street, Clonmel.

John F.O'Gorman completed his learning in London and was appointed by the Department of Agricultural and Technical Instruction, to teach the Theory of Road Carriage Building. He first traded as O'Gorman Bros, Address: 12 Wellington Street, Clonmel. and advertised 'Motor Bodies of every description built on the premises'. They were special Agents for Austin, Humber and Ford cars. Shortly after the First World War, John F. O'Gorman went to Germany and captured the first main dealership in Ireland for Mercedes-Benz cars.

The 'O'Gorman' Coachbuilding business grew around 1920, when John F. O'Gorman bought and built a factory located at Prior Park, Clonmel, County Tipperary, Ireland. He also bought the stately 'Prior Park' house, which doubled as a store area, for the company. Together with his brother Jim, they made various horse-drawn two and four wheel vehicles. They also manufactured traps, gigs, landaus, jaunting carts, carriages, floats and dray carts. The main business however, was building bus, coach, van and lorry bodies.

== Subsidiaries ==
=== South of Ireland School of Motoring ===
In the late 1920s this enterprise, situated at the factory premises, held a ten-week course at the school and included (a) Mechanism and Ignition and (b) Driving and Tyrefitting. The ten weeks tuition cost IR£15 with a shorter session of three weeks at IR£10.

=== O'Gorman's, Clonmel ===
The administrative offices of O'Gormans were situated over the shop front show room, garage at 36 & 37 Parnell Street (next to Hearns Hotel, where Charles Bianconi established his horse-drawn coach travel empire, 90 years earlier).

== Operations ==
=== 1920s ===
==== 1923 - Strike breaking ====
The O'Gorman brothers were discussed in Dáil Éireann Volume 3–18 May 1923 with regard to a strike at their Clonmel factory and bringing in workers (non-union strikebreakers) from London. The firm was engaged on several Government contracts, including building two limousines for a high official. It was proposed the company should not be allowed to carry out Government work, under conditions which are a distinct breach of the Fair Wages Clause.

==== 1927 - Supplying army lorries ====
O'Gorman Brothers supplied Mercedes-Benz 4 ton vehicles to the Irish Free State army authorities in 1927. Further details of the vehicle are listed in Commercial Motor on 10 May 1927 WHEELS OF INDUSTRY. | 10 May 1927 | The Commercial Motor Archive and 27 May 1927, Page 80.WHEELS OF INDUSTRY. | 24 May 1927 | The Commercial Motor Archive.

In the late 1920s, Irish coachbuilders were at their busiest, working on big bus-body orders. O'Gorman Brothers, employed over 100 men on one of their biggest bus orders.

==== 1928 - Coachbuilders seek protection ====
The Irish Free State Tariff Commission considered the application for the Imposition of a Protective Tariff. Details of Coachbuilding in the Irish Free State was provided by J.F.O'Gorman. He said very few bodies for motor vehicles were made in the Free State in 1927. If they obtained a tariff they would be quite capable of providing all the commercial vehicle bodies required for the Free State. He also said there was some difficulty in procuring skilled men, many of them having been attracted to England by higher wages.

==== 1929 - Tariffs on imports ====
J.F. O'Gorman called on the Government to place an effective tariff on the import of coachwork and motor bodies. He said there had been an exodus of highly skilled labour from the bodybuilding industry and the industry is capable of dealing with the country's requirements.

=== 1930s ===
The chassis for the vehicles in the 1930s, were assembled in County Cork and collected by the firm's mechanics. The Clonmel factory was the largest such establishment in the South of Ireland at the time and one of the most modernly equipped factories in the country. The first mechanical paint sprayer outside Dublin and Cork was installed at O'Gormans. The factory was renowned for its strict discipline. O'Gorman Brothers were the Ford Motor Company main dealers for all County Tipperary, Waterford City and portion of County Waterford. A number of O'Gorman Brothers single decker buses were built for Irish Omnibus Company. Several of them are listed in 1932 and 1934, on the Classic Irish Buses website.

John F. O'Gorman voiced a complaint in the Dáil Éireann, Section 554 - 25 February 1931, about the ease and amount of ash being exported (the principal raw wood material for the industry).
Messrs O'Gorman, were also quoted by Seán Lemass during a Dáil Éireann debate, Volume 45–22 December 1932 (Finance (Customs Duties) (No. 4) Bill, 1932—From the Seanad Éireann), where they claimed: the works had been occupied during the civil war, by not merely members of the Republican Army, but also by members of the National Army (The National Army was questioned by Patrick McGilligan) and that the damage done during that period had not been adequately compensated for by the Government.

The O'Gorman Coach building business continued trading until J.F. O'Gorman's death in 1943 and went into liquidation, following a downturn during the Second World War.

During its operation, the company traded variously as 'O'Gorman Brothers' (to 1933), 'O'Gormans', 'John O'Gorman & Sons', 'J.F.O'Gorman (1933) Ltd' then 'J.F.O'Gorman Ltd' (until J.F.O'Gorman's death in 1943).

== Prior Park factory and house ==
Around 1920 the stately Prior Park house and grounds were bought by J.F. O'Gorman (who owned the garage in Parnell Street). Much of the finance for this purchase, came from his first wife Margaret.

On part of the grounds near Clonmel railway station, a large factory was built, to make bodywork for road vehicles. A separate building was also constructed as a Varnish area. After J.F.O'Gorman's death, the site was sold to Curran Signs & Graphics Ltd. When Curran moved, the factory was sold to developers and it is now, residential Ormonde Court.

Prior Park house, lived in by John F. O'Gorman and his large family, was originally a girls' boarding school (run by Quakers). The basement and unused servants' quarters were used to hold company stores. After his death in 1943, ownership passed to his second wife Catherine. When she died in 1970 it was passed to three of their children, who were living there at the time. Prior Park House was demolished in 1997 and the area is now, Redwood Gardens, named after the giant California redwood trees that used to grow around the grounds. The area is still known as 'Prior Park', which is north of the Oakville Estate.

== J.F. O'Gorman ==
John F. O'Gorman was reared near Glennagat, close to New Inn, County Tipperary. He had two sons from his first wife, Margaret Smyth of Ardfinnan, County Tipperary (1878–1927). After her death he married again on 16 January 1929, Catherine O'Brien of Shanagolden, County Limerick (1902 – 20 October 1970) and they had 5 boys and 4 girls. Whilst in Clonmel, J.F.O'Gorman lived at: (1) 17 Dillon Street (He originally didn't have an 'O' in his surname) (2) 6 Prince Edward's Place (renamed to Dr Croke Place)(3) Sweetbriar Lodge (No. 36 Thomas Street, Clonmel East Urban) (4) Prior Park House.

He became well known locally, for his business skills and entrepreneurship. In his obituary in The Nationalist, it describes him as having exceptional ability and he took a keen interest in the development of Irish industry generally and worked for its advancement for many years, especially in Clonmel. It also reported that he was largely responsible for the formation of the Irish Motor Traders' Association. A body now called SIMI, Society of the Irish Motor Industry, which was formed when the Society of the Irish Motor Traders Ltd and the Irish Motor Traders Association merged in 1968.

In April 1925 a group of local business people including John F. O'Gorman established the Clonmel Chamber of Commerce — J.F. O'Gorman was elected as their first president. William Magner (famous for Magners cider manufactured in Clonmel) was elected as vice president.

== Glass negative photographs ==
In April 1922 and April 1934, high quality 'glass negative' photographs, were taken by A H Poole & Co. In 2012, some were placed on the internet by the National Library of Ireland (NLI). They are of vehicles being built at Prior Park garage and the shop front in Parnell Street. They include a picture of J.F.O'Gorman, the directors, workers, the factory premises, Prior Park house and various machinery in the workshop.

== Gallery ==
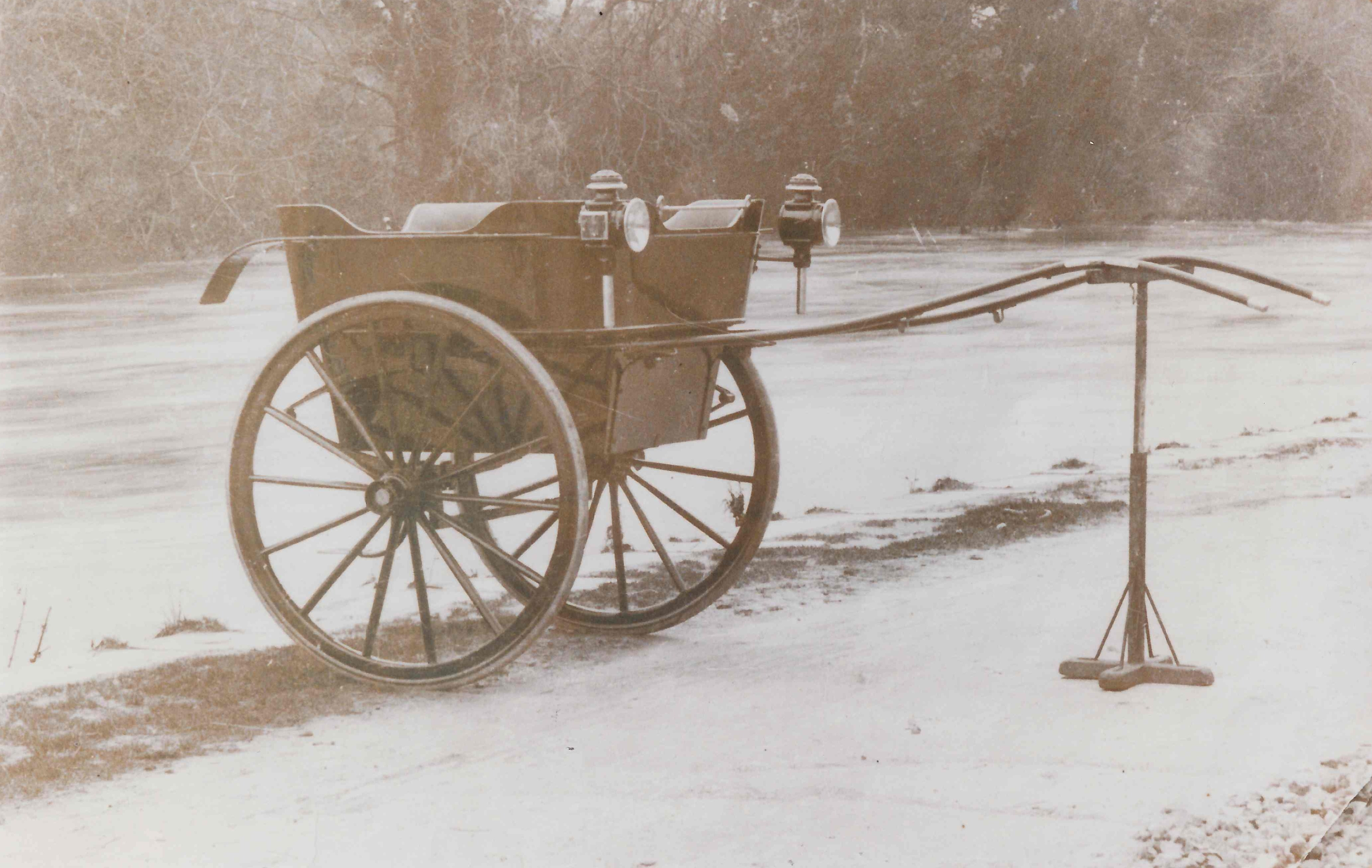
A trap by the River Suir, Clonmel, built by O'Gorman Bros.

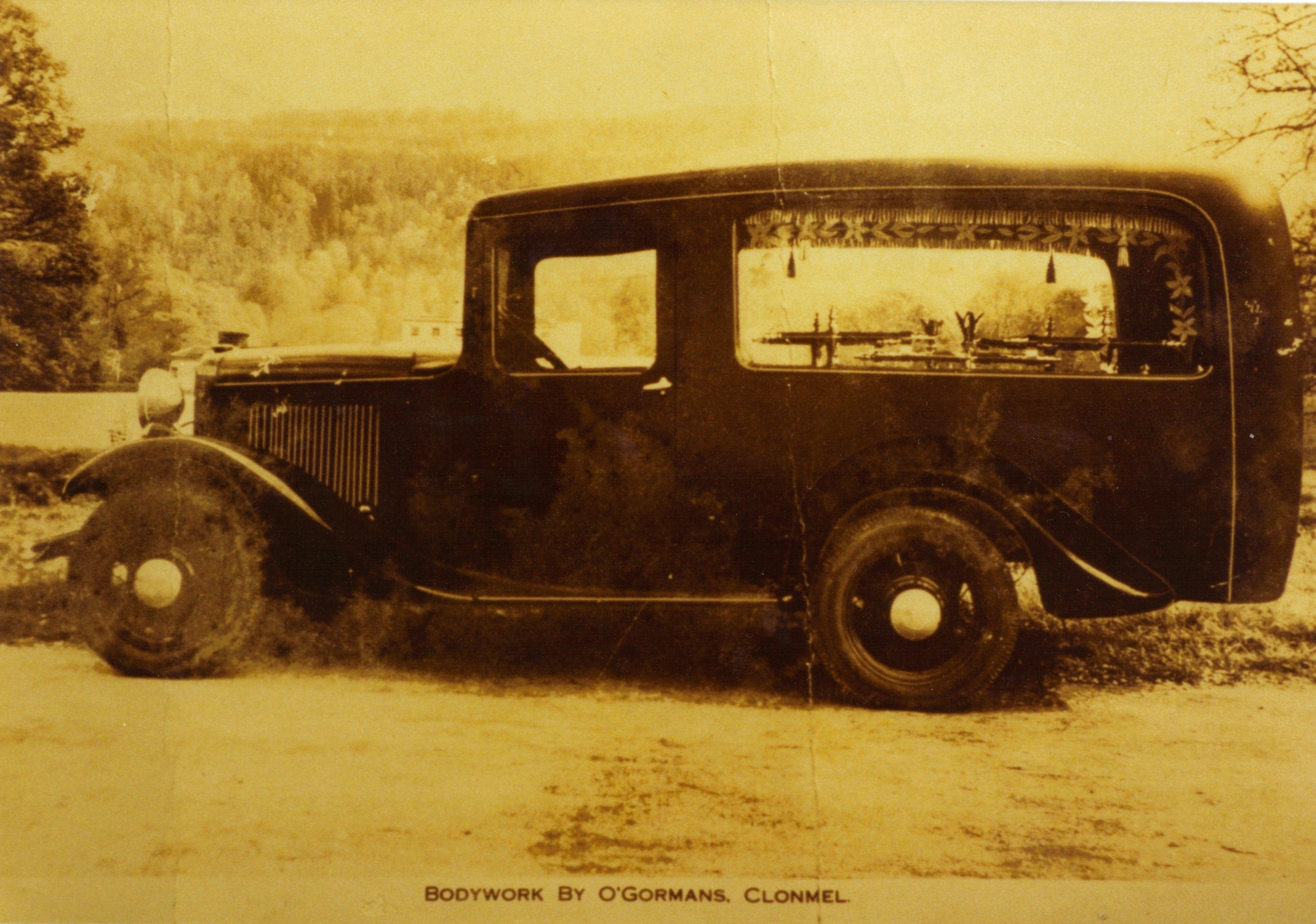
Bodywork by O'Gormans

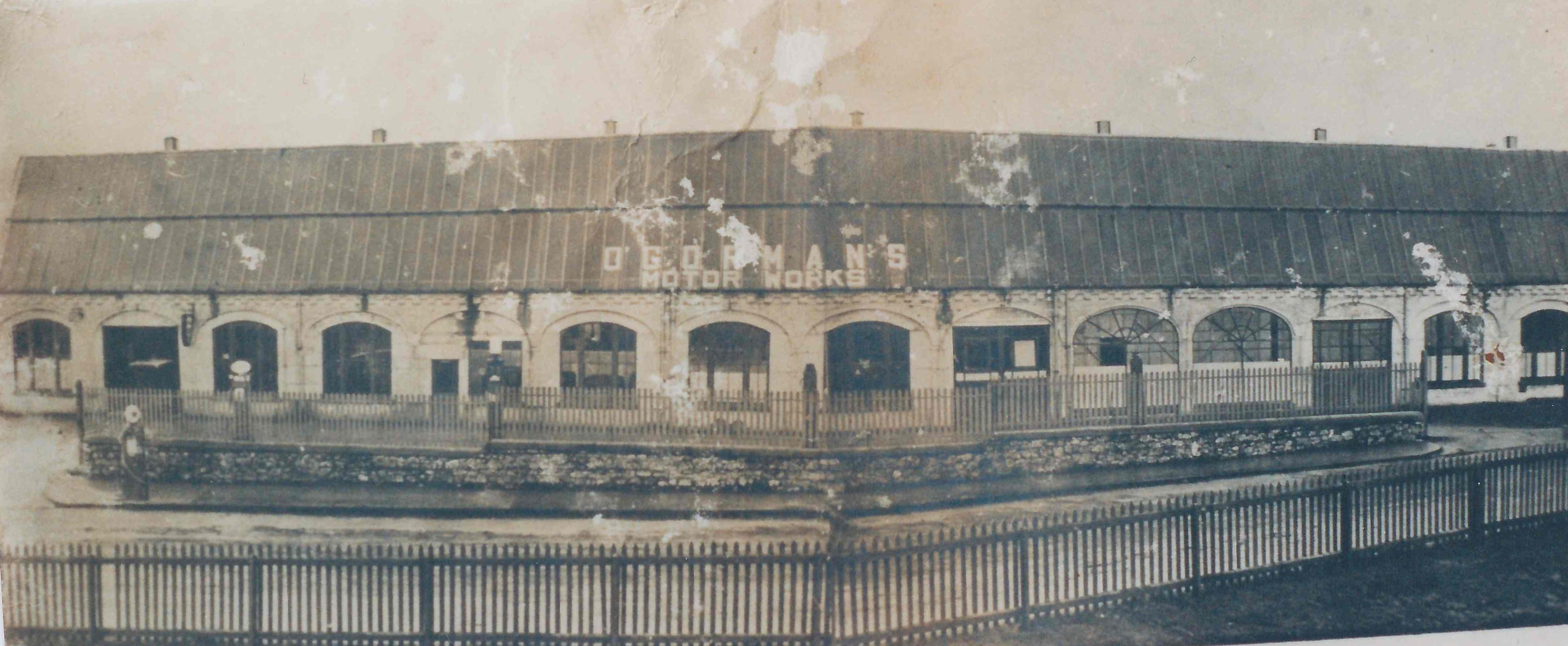
O'Gormans factory

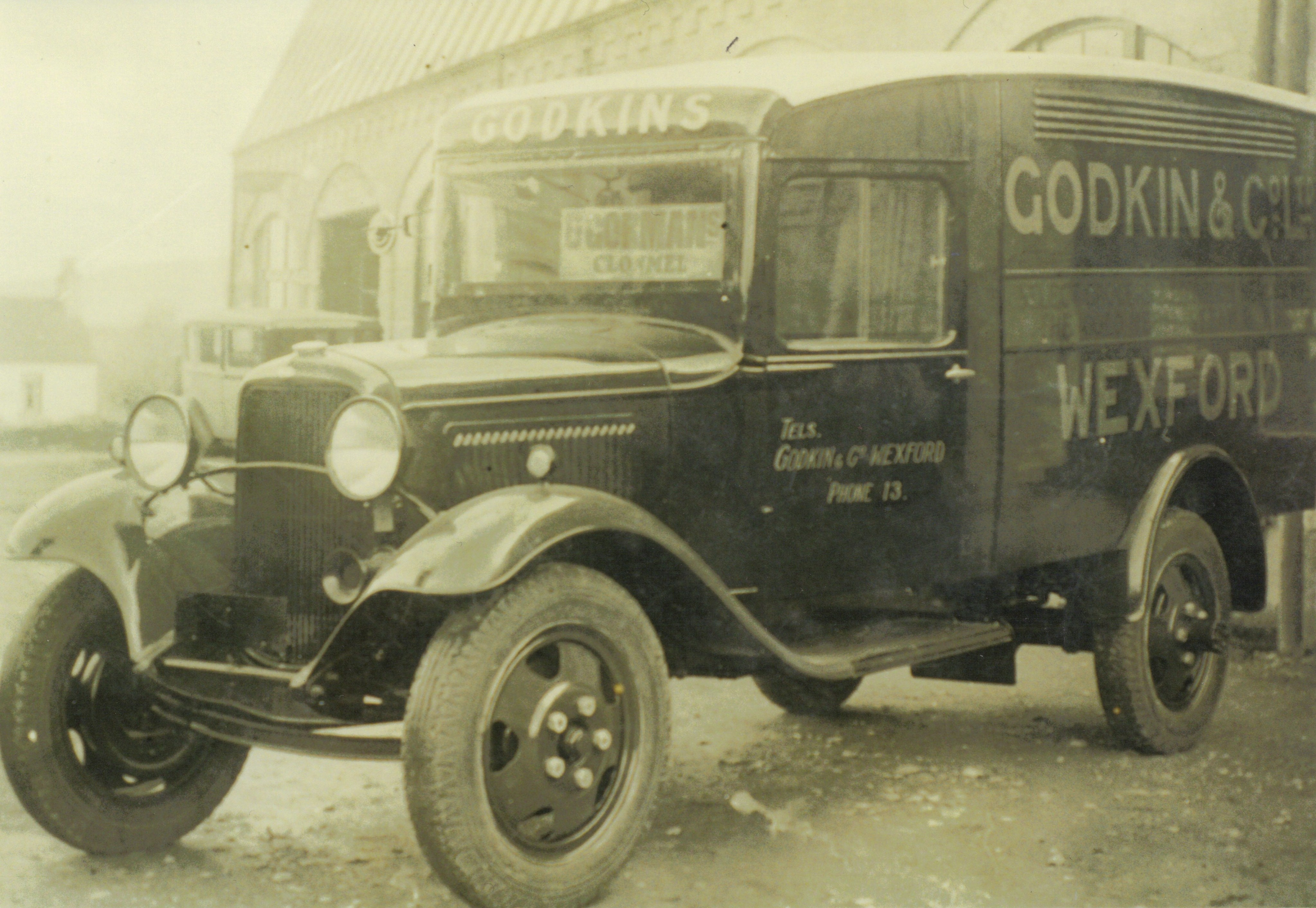
GODKIN & Co van built by O'Gormans

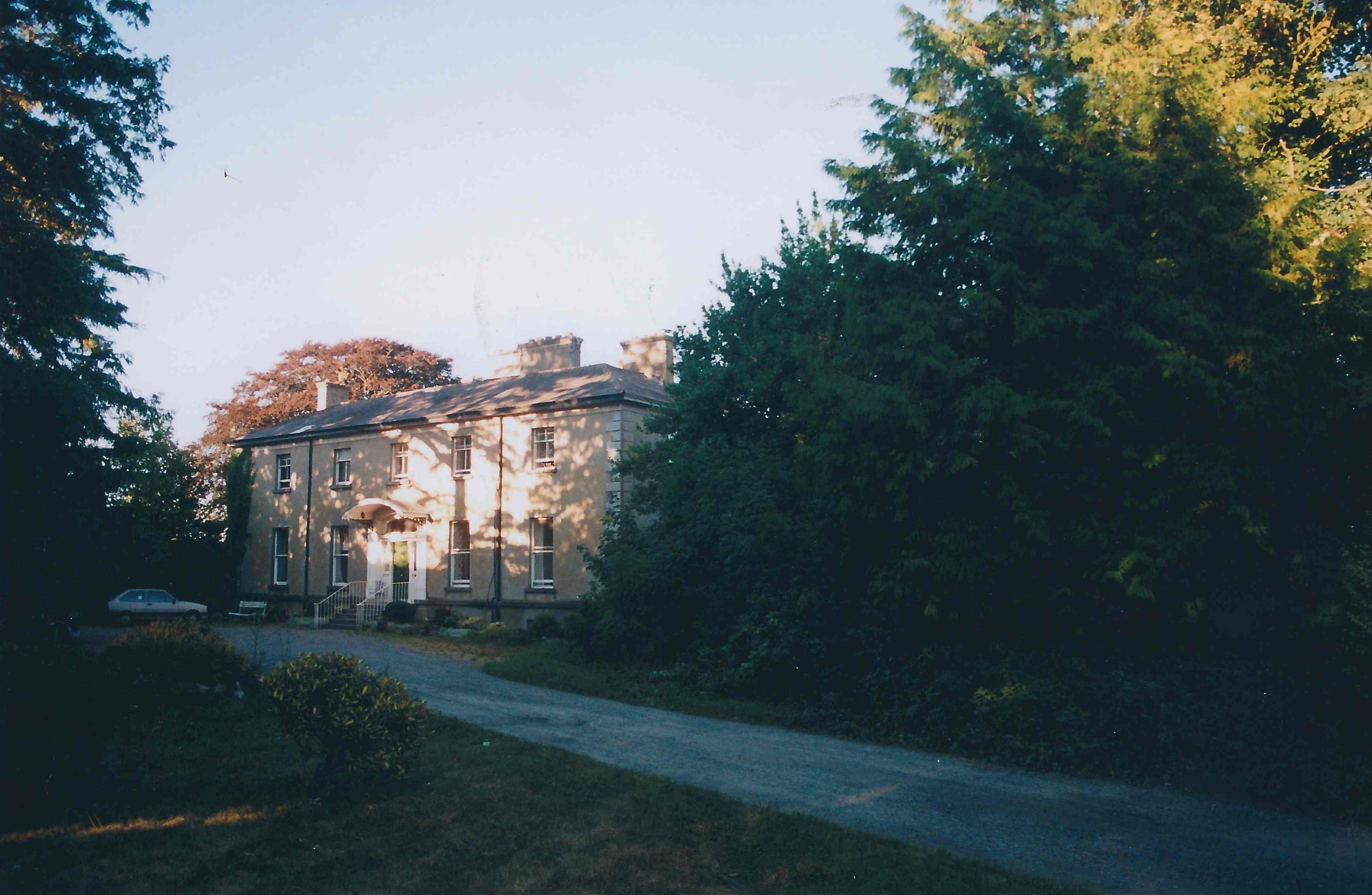
Prior Park house shortly before it was demolished in 1997

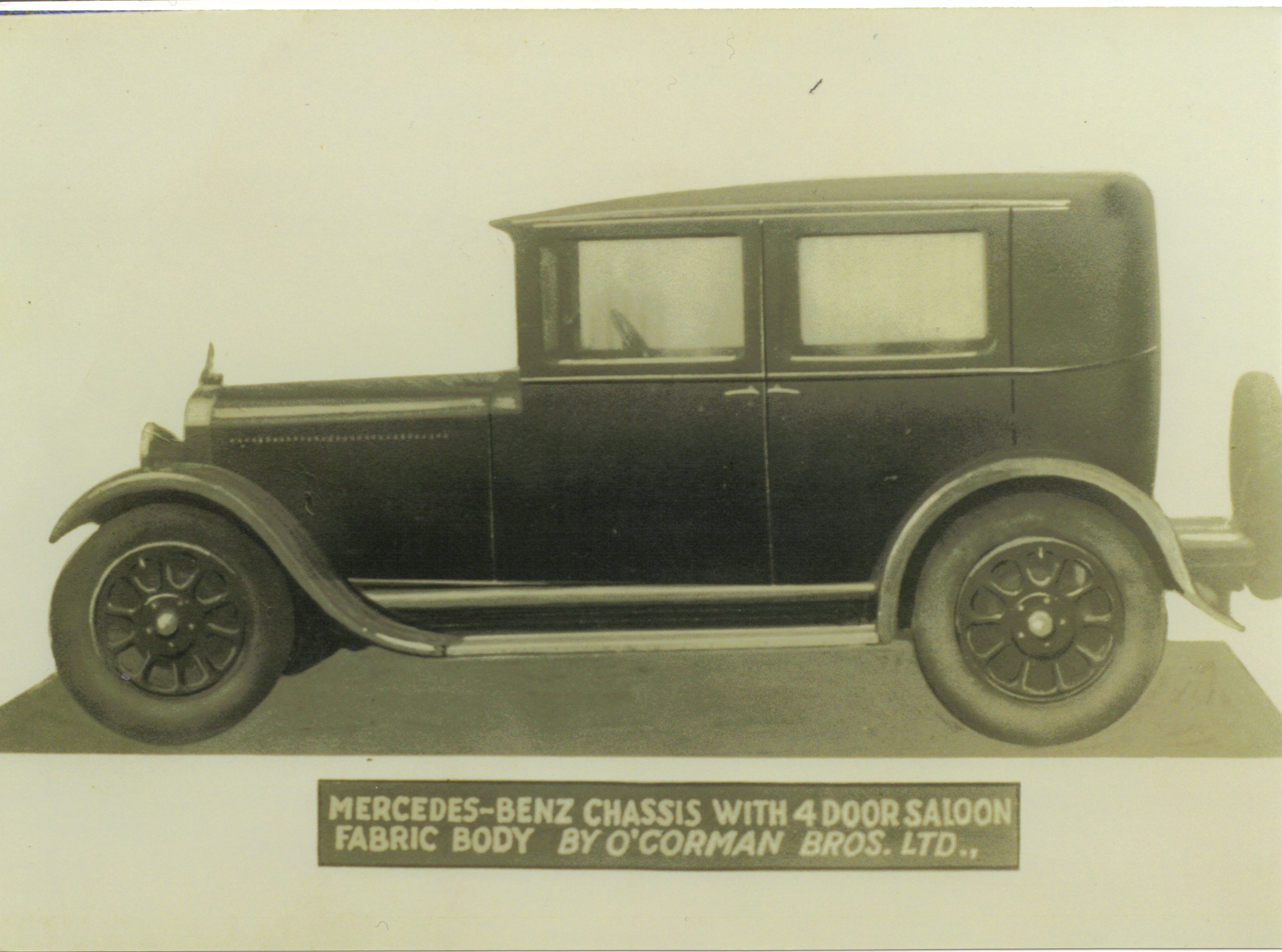
Mercedes-Benz Chassis. Bodywork by O'Gorman Bros.

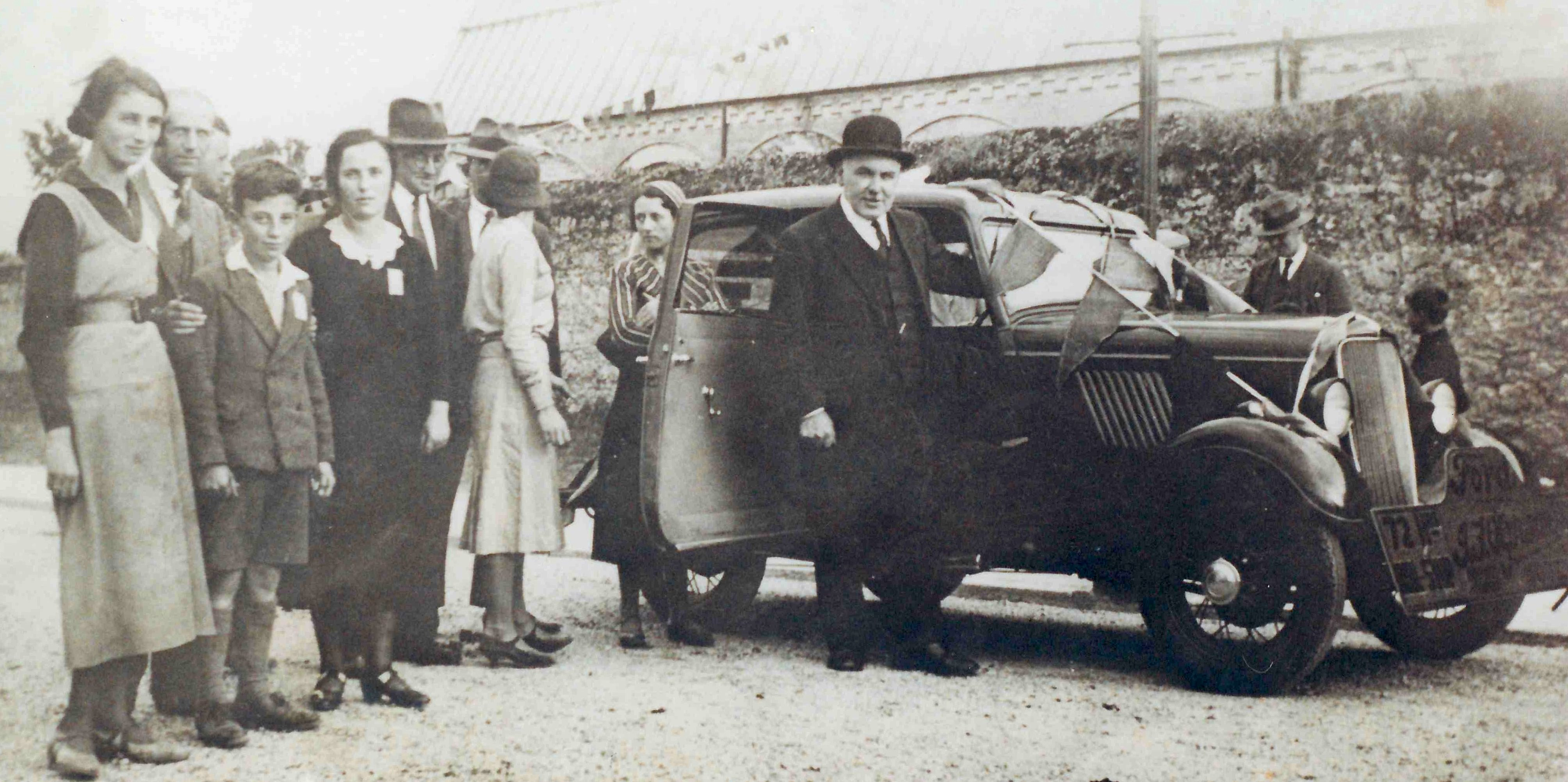
The Mayor of Clonmel presents a newly built Ford outside the factory

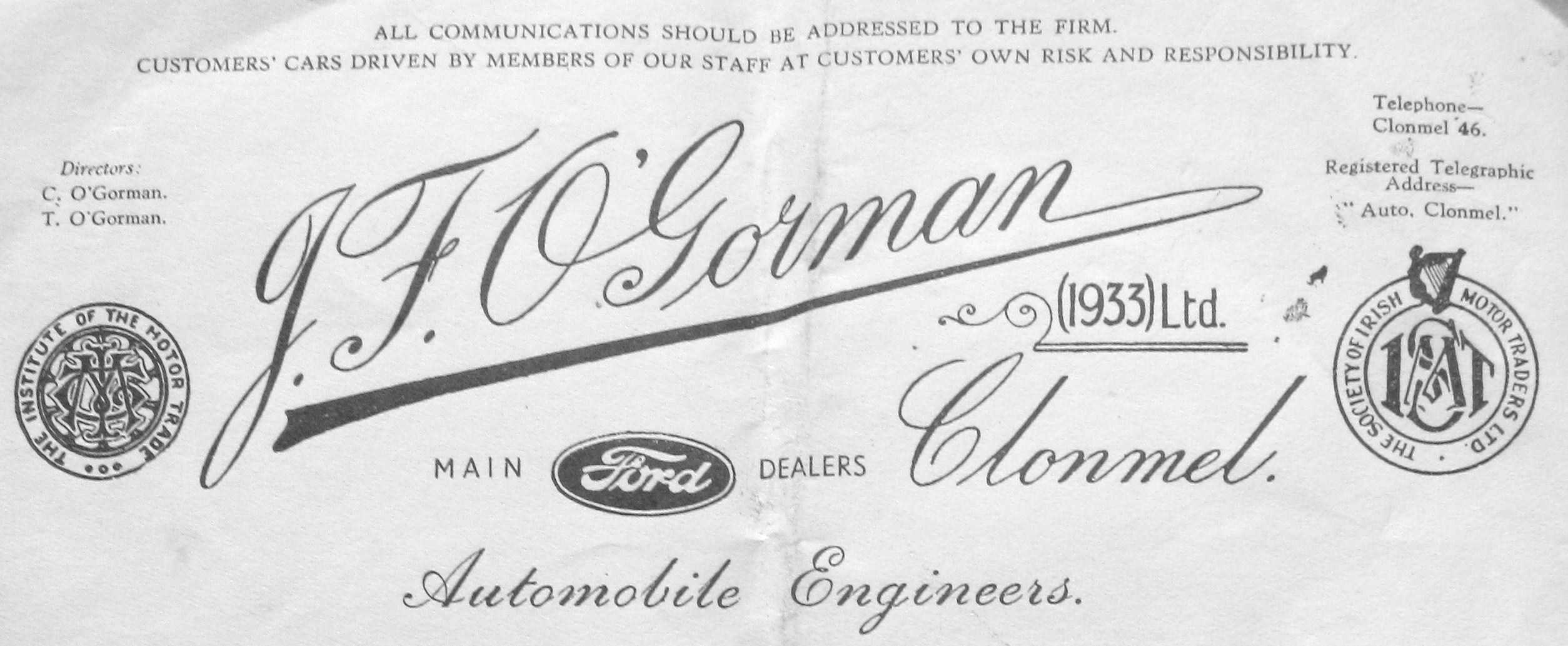
Company headed paper

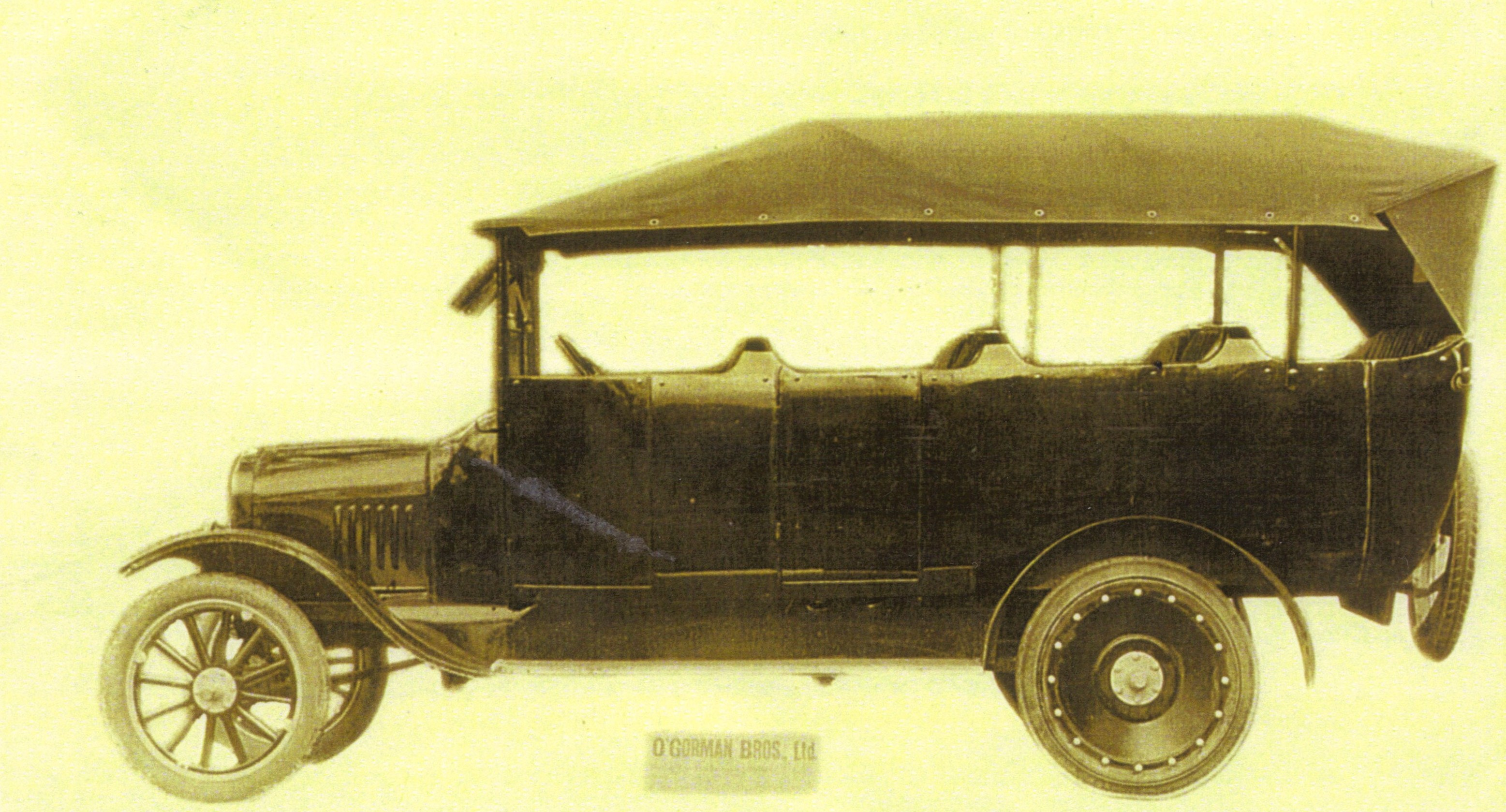
Bodywork by O'Gorman Bros. (with different type of front & rear wheels)
