= Carrosserie C. & R. Geissberger =

Swiss coachbuilder

Carrosserie C. & R. Geissberger was a Swiss coachbuilder.

The company emerged in 1903 from a carriage-building business in Zurich. Before the First World War, around 150 employees were employed and Geissberger was the second largest company of its kind in Switzerland. The company was based on Wiesenstrasse in Zurich.

The manufacturer used chassis from Martini, Delage, Hispano-Suiza, Mercedes-Benz and Peugeot, as well as from the commercial vehicle manufacturer Saurer, which also manufactured passenger cars until 1914. In 1929, the Carrosserie Georges Gangloff in Geneva, also founded in 1903, took over the business and continued it for a short time as a branch. At the latest, with the bankruptcy of the parent company in 1936, production in Zurich also ended. The facilities were taken over by Carrosserie Langenthal AG in 1937.

== Literature ==
- Ferdinand Hediger: Schweizer Carrossiers 1890-1970, 1. Auflage 2013, SwissClassics Publishing AG, Bäch SZ (Schweiz); ISBN 978-3-9524171-0-2, Hardcover
- Die Schweizer Carrossiers. Katalog zur Sonderausstellung im Pantheon Basel vom 27. Oktober 2013 – 6. April 2014.
- Ferdinand Hediger: Klassische Wagen 1919–1939. Hallwag-Verlag, Ostfildern 1998, ISBN 3-444-10348-4.
- Roger Gloor: Nachkriegswagen. Personenautos 1945–1960. Hallwag-Verlag Bern/Stuttgart 1982, ISBN 3-444-10263-1.
- Roger Gloor: Personenwagen der 60er Jahre. Hallwag-Verlag, Ostfildern 1998, ISBN 3-444-10307-7.
- G. N. Georgano (Hrsg.): Complete Encyclopedia of Motorcars, 1885 to the Present; Dutton Press, New York, 2. Auflage (Hardcover) 1973, ISBN 0-525-08351-0 (English)
