= Carrozzeria Varesina =

Italian automobile manufacturer

- Industry: Automotive
- Founded: 1845; 181 years ago in Varese, Lombardy, Italy
- Defunct
- Headquarters: Bollate, Italy
- Products: Double-decker buses

Carrozzeria Varesina (established 1845 in Varese) was an Italian coachbuilder, known for their work on industrial vehicles such as double-decker buses for both touring and urban transport. Among their models was ten units of the "Filobus" Alfa Romeo 110AF (1939). They also made bodies for prototypes of cars for companies such as Lancia and Zagato.

A current company with the same name and area of expertise (established 1975) resides in Ospiate di Bollate.
