= Rippon Bros =

English coach building business

Rippon Bros was a coach building business thought to have begun as early as the 16th century.

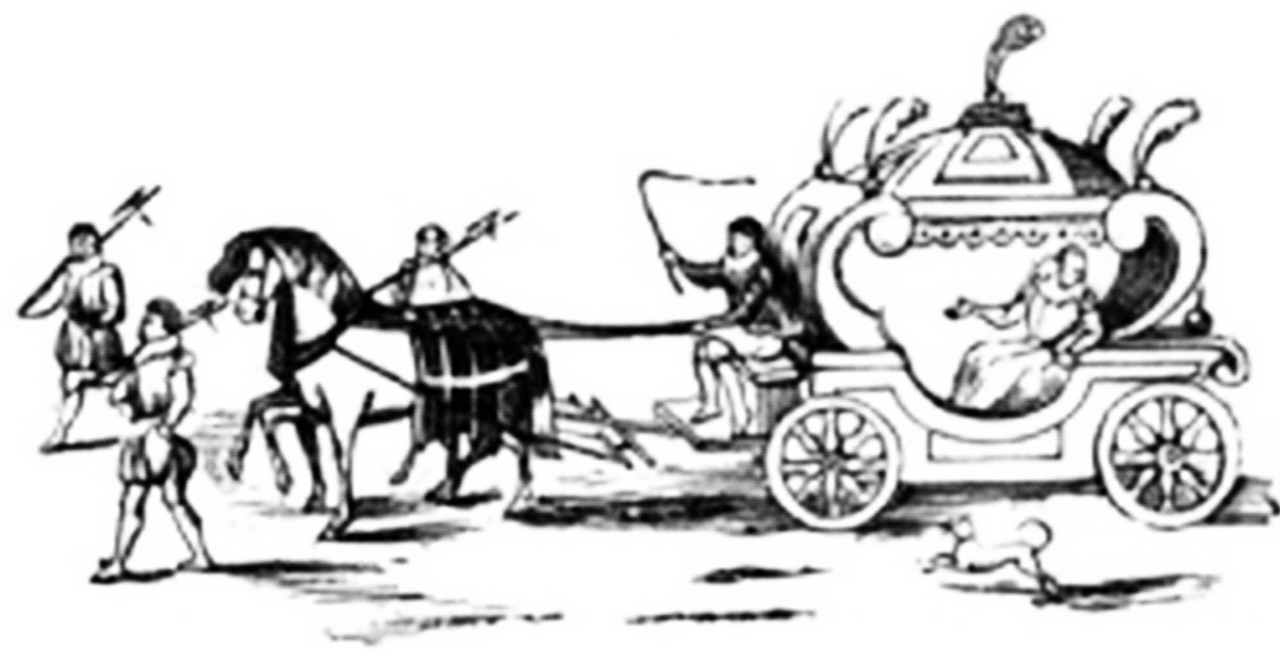
Rippon's coach for Queen Elizabeth

Historian John Stowe (1524/25 – 1605) reported that in 1555 Walter Rippon made a coach for the Earl of Rutland, and that in 1564 he made a state coach for Queen Elizabeth. It is thought Rippon built the coach but not its decoration.

It is believed the same business was more recently operated in Huddersfield, Yorkshire by William Rippon and Charles Marsom as Rippon & Marsom then from 1882 it was taken on by Rippon's two sons - William Edward Rippon (1858-1949) and Joseph Rippon. Eventually it was owned by Rippon Bros Limited and its chairman was Colonel Reginald Rippon who died in 1969. The business closed in 1970.

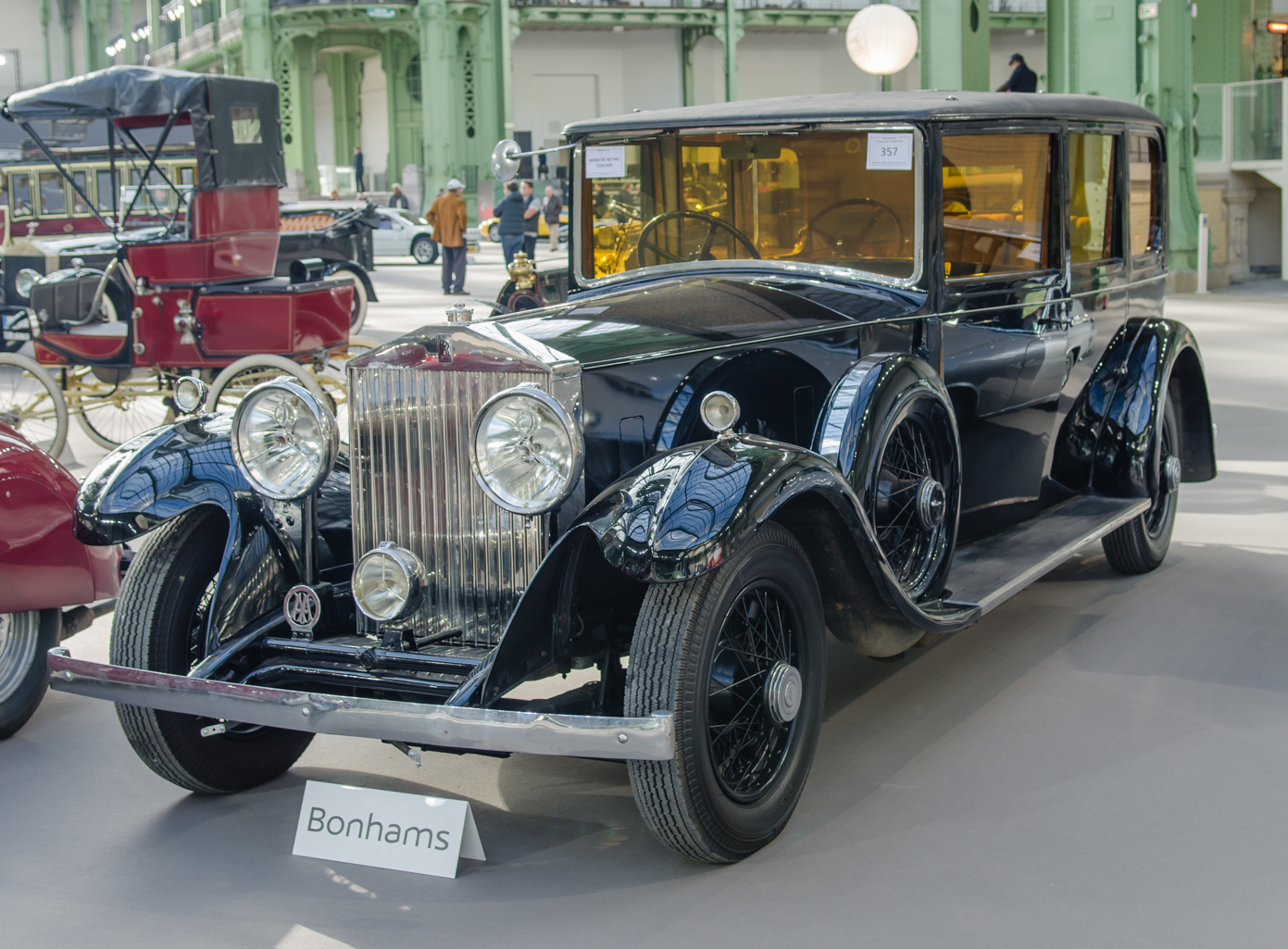
Limousine by Rippon Bros on a 1933 Rolls-Royce Phantom II chassis
