= Billeter & Cartier =

French coachbuilding company

- Industry: Automotive
- Founder: 1919
- Defunct: 1935
- Headquarters: Lyon, France

Billeter & Cartier was a French coachbuilding company.

== History ==
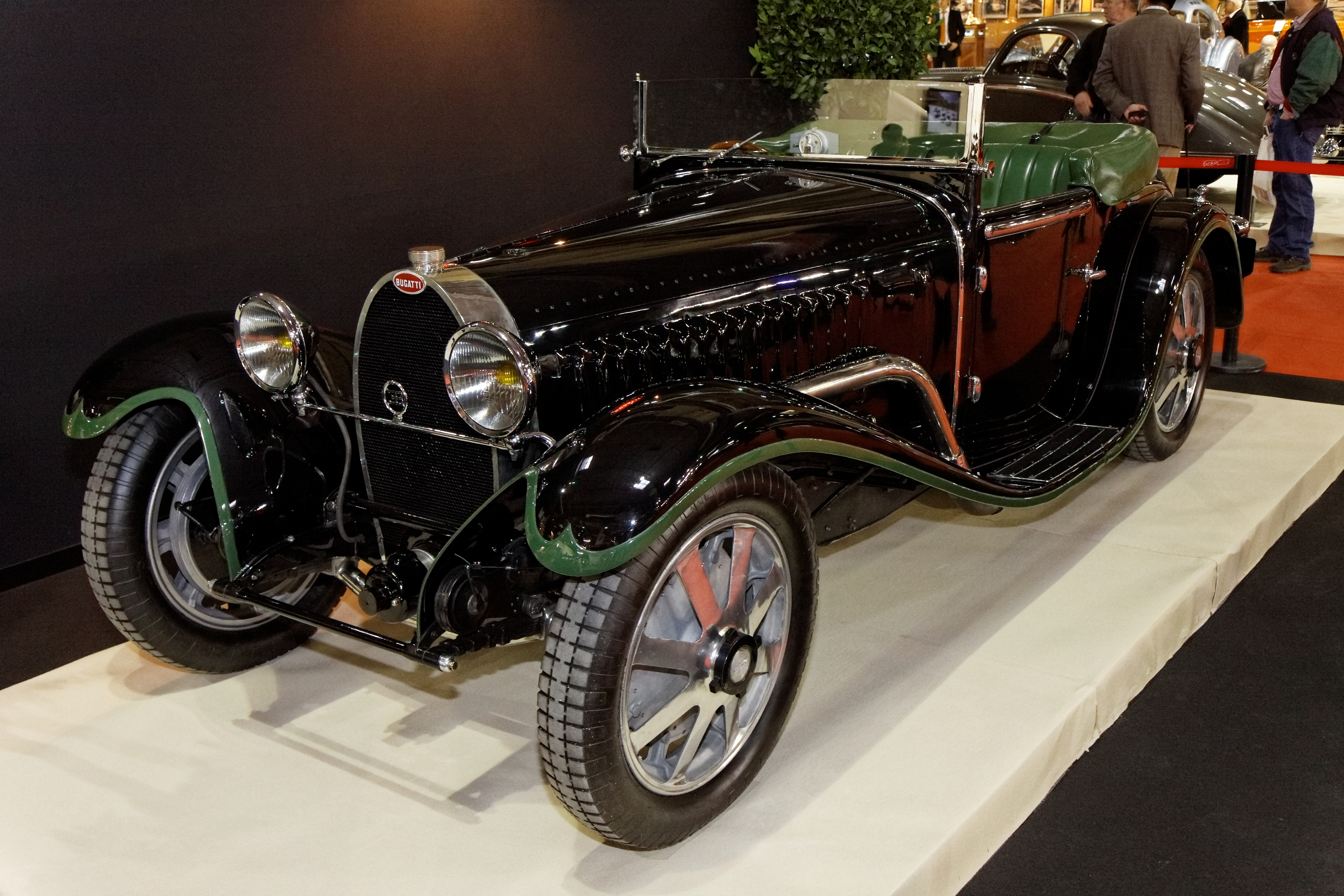
Bugatti Type 55 with bodywork by Billeter & Cartier

The company was founded in Lyon in 1919. In the same year, the production of car bodies began. A license was taken over from Gustave Baehr, but not all bodies were built under Baehr's license. Limousine and torpedo bodies are mentioned. Most of the chassis came from the local manufacturers Berliet and especially Rochet-Schneider. In addition, some bodies were made for Renault and Bugatti.

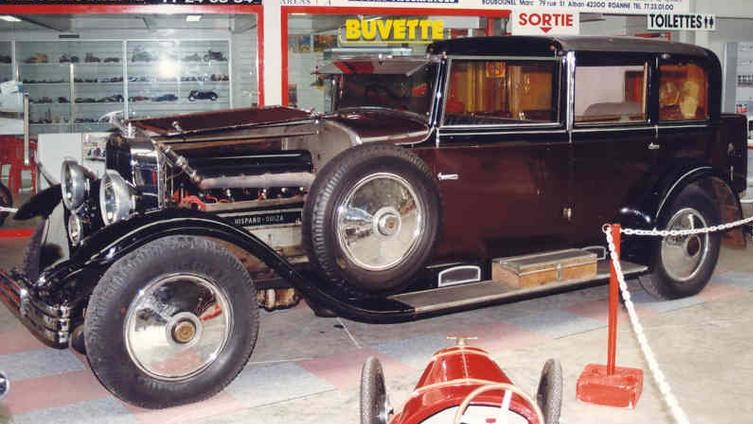
Hispano-Suiza H6B with bodywork by Billeter & Cartier

In the 1930s, Berliet and Rochet-Schneider reduced their range of passenger cars. Production ended in 1935.

== Preserved vehicles ==
A Bugatti Type 55 from 1932 with a body by Billeter & Cartier has been preserved.

A Rochet-Schneider from 1929 was auctioned in 2008 for 103,500 euros.

Another Rochet-Schneider from 1930 was offered at auction on July 1, 2021.

== Literature ==
- Georgano, G. N. (2000). The Beaulieu Encyclopedia of the Automobile. Chicago: Fitzroy Dearborn Publishers. ISBN 978-1-57958-293-7.
