= Coachcraft Ltd. =

Defunct American motor vehicle manufacturer

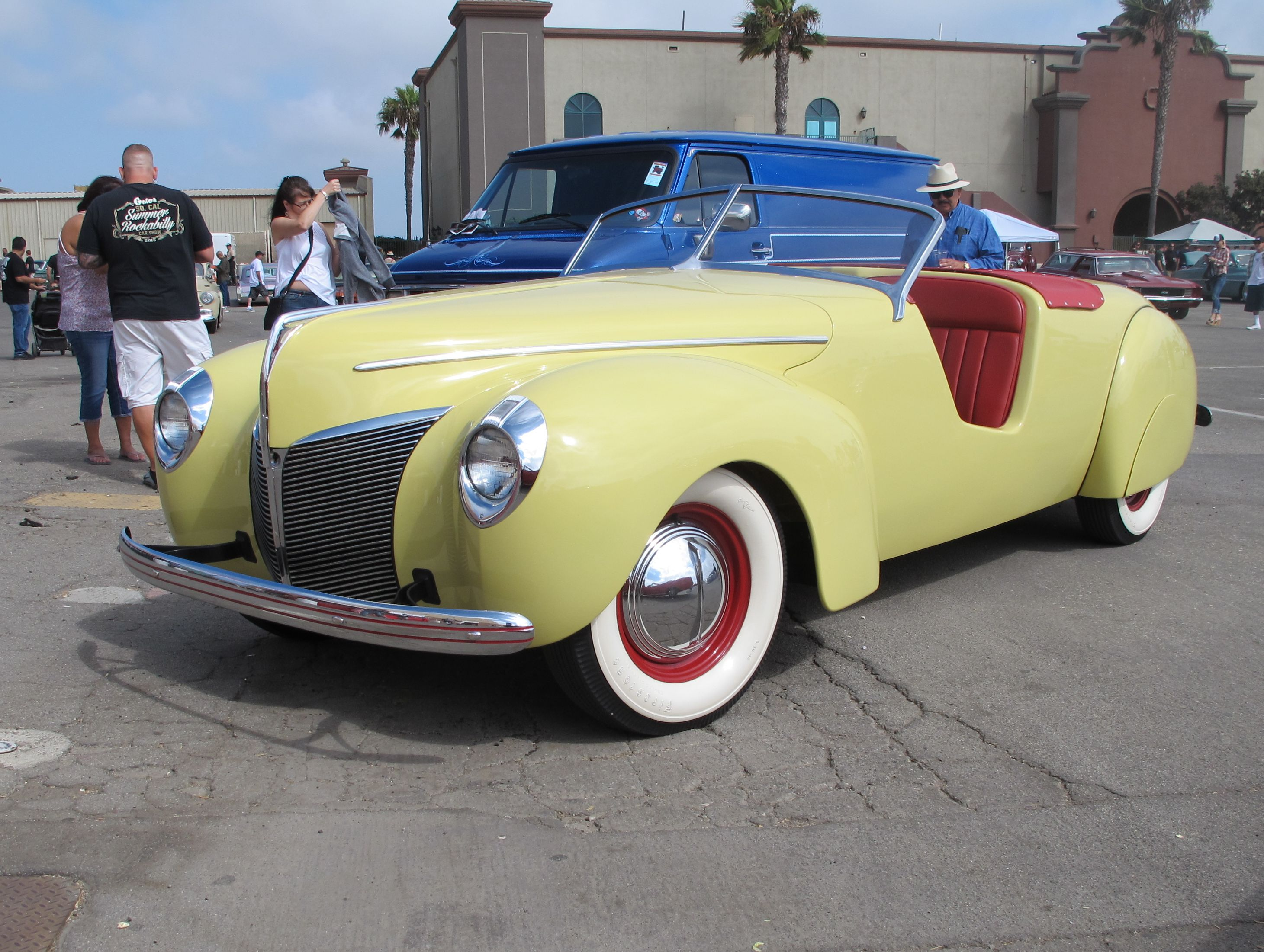
Pre-war car by Coachcraft

Coachcraft Ltd. of North Hollywood, California built several modified cars. Strother MacMinn called the "Yankee Doodle Roadster" by Coachcraft the "first American custom sports car."
