= Lincoln L series =

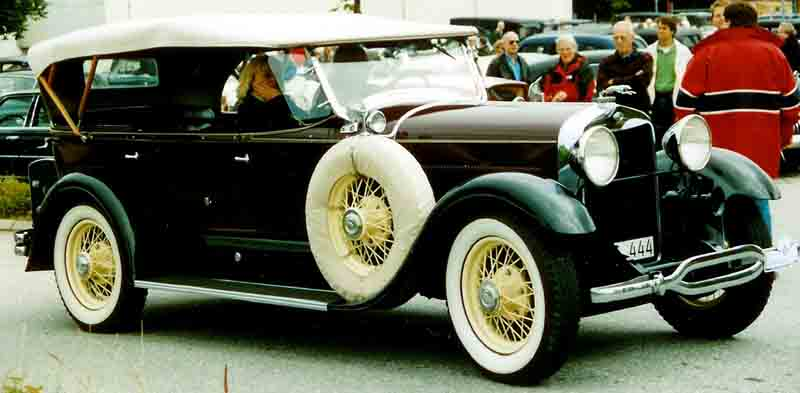
- 1929 Lincoln L-series Sport Touring

Overview
- Manufacturer: Lincoln Motor Company; Lincoln (Ford)
- Also called: Lincoln Model L
- Production: 1920–1930
- Assembly: United States: Detroit, Michigan (Lincoln Motor Company Plant)
- Designer: Angus Woodbridge; Edsel Ford

Body and chassis
- Class: Luxury car
- Body style: 2-door convertible 4-door convertible 2-door coupe 4-door sedan 4-door town car 4-door limousine 4-door phaeton
- Layout: FR layout

Powertrain
- Engine: 1917–1927: 90 hp 357.8 cu in (5.9 L) Lincoln Fork and Blade V8; 1928–1930: 90 hp 384.8 cu in (6.3 L) Lincoln Fork and Blade V8
- Transmission: 3-speed manual

Dimensions
- Wheelbase: 1917–1922: 130 in (3,302.0 mm); 1923–1930: 136 in (3,454.4 mm)

Chronology
- Successor: Lincoln K series/Model K

The Lincoln L series (also called the Lincoln Model L) is a luxury car introduced by the Lincoln Motor Company in 1921 as its first automobile. It was manufactured in Detroit, Michigan, and would continue on after the bankruptcy of Lincoln in 1922 and its purchase by Ford Motor Company.

The debut Lincoln was positioned at the top end of the motorcar marketplace, competing against the Mercedes-Benz 630, Rolls-Royce Phantom I, Renault Type MC, Packard Twin Six, and Cadillac Type 61. It was replaced during 1930 by the Model K.

== Model history ==
=== 1917–1922 ===
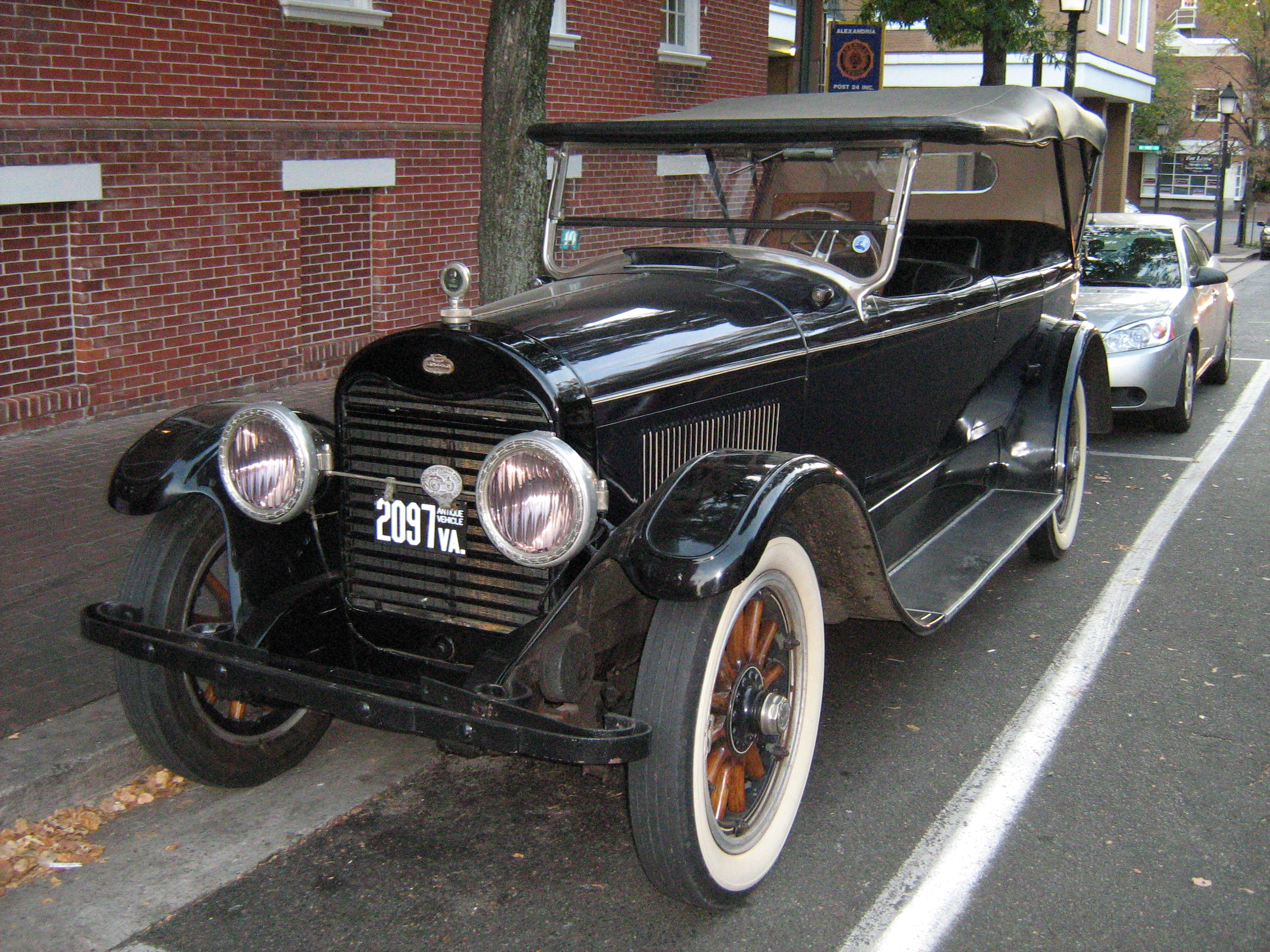
1922 Lincoln L-series Touring Sedan

After leaving the company over a dispute with William Durant over World War I production, Cadillac founder Henry Leland created the Lincoln Motor Company. Initially, the company produced Liberty V12 aircraft engines as its only source of revenue. With the war concluded, and at the age of 74, Leland decided to make the Lincoln Motor car. The company was reorganized in 1920 and created the first L-series car in 1920, for sale as a 1921 model.

The L series was designed by Angus Woodbridge, the son-in-law of Henry Leland; trained as a ladies hatmaker, the design of the L series was considered old-fashioned for the time. The company catered early on to providing custom coachwork for its clients, and both Brunn and Judkins offered two choices each. 15 selections were available from Lincoln's own coachbuilders; roadsters, coupes, touring sedans, phaetons, and broughams, with a Town Car offered at US$6,600 ($119,132 in 2025 dollars). Brunn offered both a roadster and a phaeton, while Judkins offered both a sedan and a berline with glass partitions. To further accommodate the particular client, a rolling chassis was sold for US$4,000 ($72,201 in 2025 dollars).

After World War I, the Lincoln Motor Company struggled in the postwar recession with repeated, false tax evasion claims. Total calendar year production for 1920 and 1921 were quoted to be 2,957.

Year	Engine	HP	Transmission	Wheelbase	Tire size
1921	357.8 cu in (5.9 L) 60° L-head V8	81	3-speed manual	130 in (3,302 mm)	23"

=== 1922–1923 ===
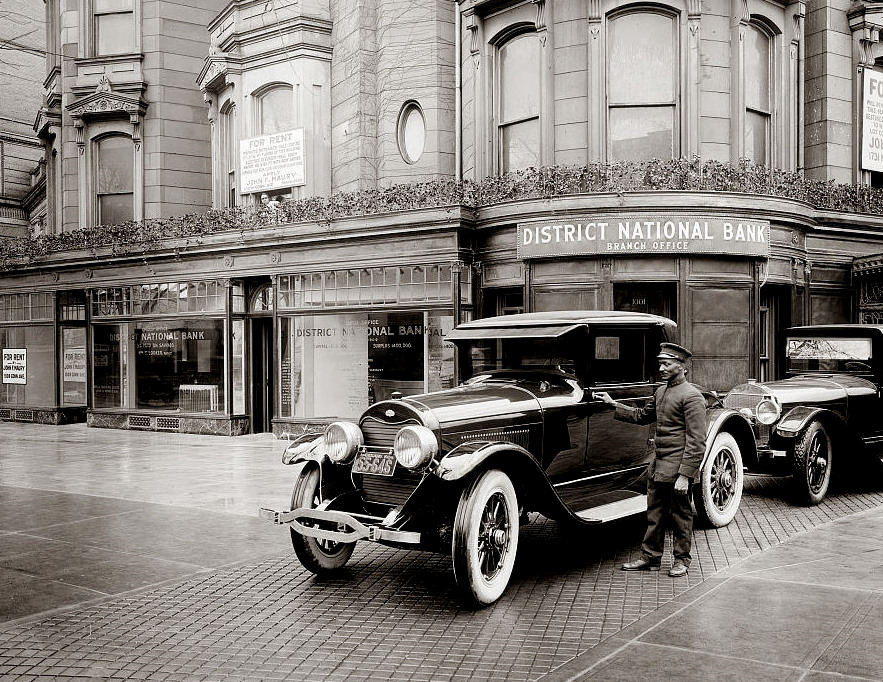
1923 Lincoln L-series Brunn coupe

In financial trouble, Leland sold the company to Henry Ford February 4, 1922 for $8 million ($153,876,740 in 2025 dollars), the amount determined by the judge presiding over the receivership Arthur J. Tuttle. Henry Leland valued the company at over $16 million. After a few months the Lelands left the company because of Henry Ford's managerial style and his son, Edsel Ford, designed a new body for the L series. Edsel became president and Ernest C. Kanzler general manager. The L series was a robust car. In the first year, hydraulic shock absorbers were added. Edsel and Kanzler implemented production economies, trimming manufacturing costs by about $1000 per car.

Aside from the extension of the wheelbase from 130 to 136 inches, the chassis of the Lincoln Model L saw few major changes; the 60-degree L-head V8 remained in production. The V8 used a novel approach for the piston connecting rods called Fork and Blade, which meant two connecting rods shared one bearing on the crankshaft, which allowed for a short crankshaft and a smaller overall engine size, while still displacing 357.8 cu in (5.9 L). The cylinders in both banks are also not offset from each other.

For 1923, several new body styles were introduced for the Model L under the direction of Edsel, including two and three-window four-door sedans, and a four-passenger phaeton. Other vehicles included a two-passenger roadster, and a $5,200 ($98,262 in 2025 dollars) seven-passenger touring sedan and limousine. A sedan, limousine, cabriolet, and town car were also offered by coachbuilders LeBaron, Fleetwood, Judkins, Derham, Holbrook, Willoughby and Dietrich, and a second cabriolet was offered by coachbuilder Brunn. Vehicles built by these coachbuilders went for as much as $7,200; despite the relatively niche market segment, Lincoln sales rose about 45 percent to produce 7,875 cars and the company was operating at a profit by the end of 1923.

Year	Engine	HP	Transmission	Wheelbase	tire size
1923	357.8 cu in (5.9 L)	90	3-speed manual	136 in (3,454 mm)	23"

=== 1924–1926 ===
In 1924, the L series was given a newer look with such things as a nickel-plated radiator shell, while 1925 is identified by the absence of cowl lights. Front and rear bumpers became standard. The smallest L series was the 2-door, 2-passenger roadster. 1926 was basically the same except for some interior changes.

In 1924 large touring sedans began to be used by police departments around the country. They were known as Police Flyers, which were equipped with four-wheel brakes, two years before they were introduced on private-sale vehicles. These specially equipped vehicles, with bulletproof windshields measuring 7/8 of an inch thick and spot lights mounted on the ends of the windshield, also came with an automatic windshield wiper for the driver and a hand-operated wiper for the front passenger. Police whistles were coupled to the exhaust system and gun racks were also fitted to these vehicles.

Year	Engine	HP	Transmission	Wheelbase	tire size
1925	357.8 cu in (5.9 L) V8	90	3-speed manual	136 in (3,454 mm)	23"

=== 1927–1930 ===
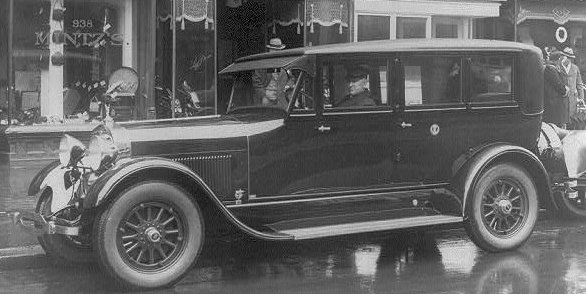
1927-28 Lincoln L-series limousine

In 1927, the L series got smaller wheels with 4-wheel standard mechanical brakes. All instruments were on an oval surface. A larger engine (though no HP increase) came in 1928. 1929 brought Safety glass and dual windshield wipers. 1930 was the last year for the L series.

Year	Engine	HP	Transmission	Wheelbase	tire size
1928	384.8 cu in (6.3 L) V8	90	3-speed manual	136 in (3,454 mm)	20"

== Coachbuilders ==
Lincoln chose not to make yearly model changes, used as a marketing tool of the time, designed to lure new customers. Lincoln customers of the time were known to purchase more than one Lincoln with different bodywork, so changing the vehicle yearly was not done to accommodate their customer base.

Lincoln contracted with dozens of custom coachbuilders during the 1920s and early 30s, including American, Anderson, Babcock, Holbrook, Brunn, Judkins, Lang, LeBaron, Locke, Murray, Towson, and Willoughby in the 1920s. Murphy, Rollston, and Waterhouse were added in the 1930s. Even on factory direct orders special and bespoke items were accommodated on a customer basis, with such standard options available as a nickel-plated radiator shell for $25, varnished natural wood wheels for $15, Disteel steel disc wheels for $60, or Rudge-Whitworth center-lock wire wheels for $100.

== In media ==
A 1924 Lincoln was featured in the first season of the classic CBS sitcom The Good Guys.

In the 1986 comedy movie, The Money Pit, the house came with a 1929-30 Lincoln L-series 4-door Sport Phaeton as a part of the purchase.
