= Holbrook Company =

Defunct American motor vehicle body manufacturer

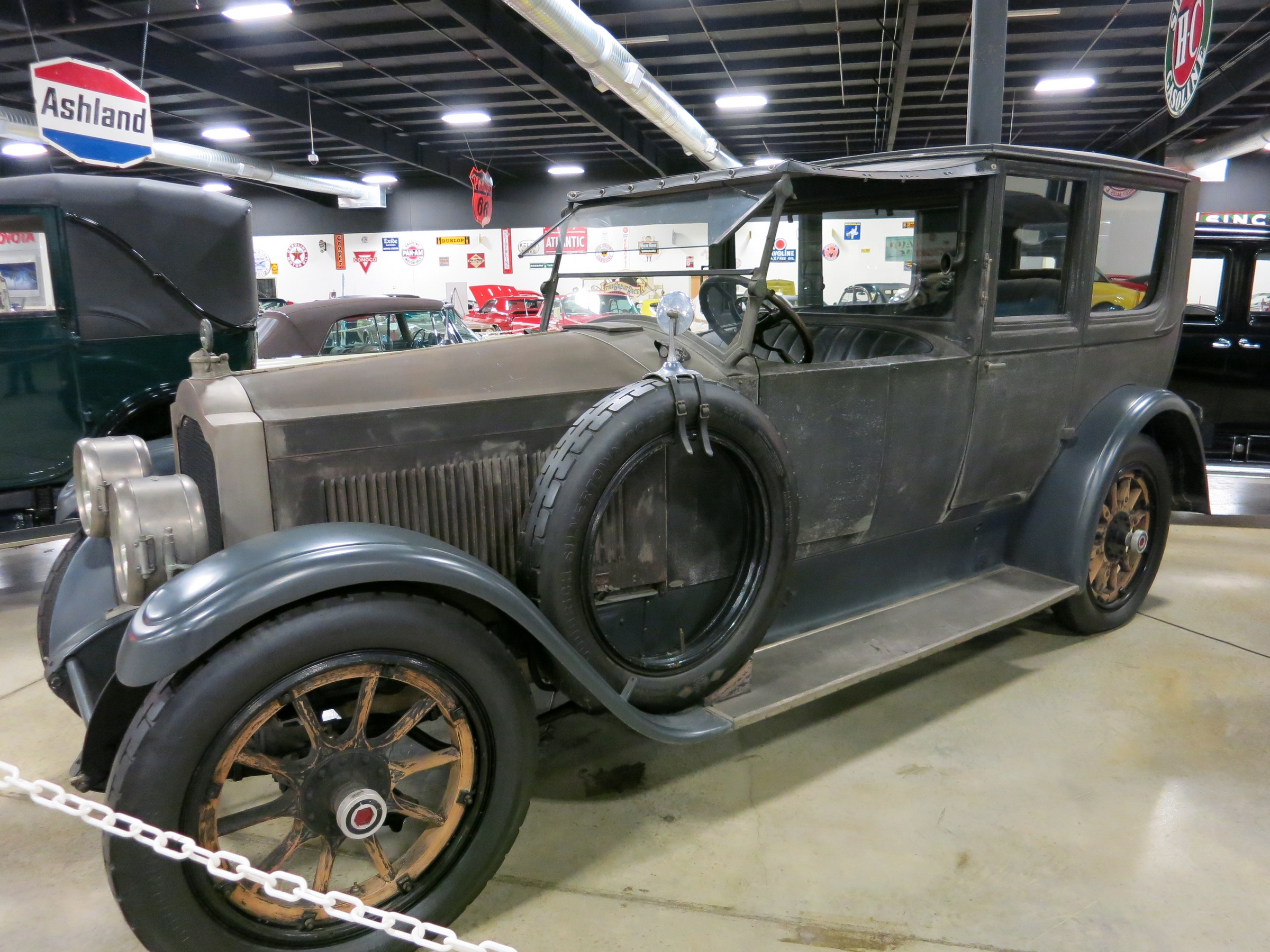
Open-drive limousine body on a 1921 Packard Twin-Six chassis

Holbrook Company of Hudson, New York manufactured custom automobile bodies and their leading customer was Packard Motor Company.

== Founded ==
Harry F Holbrook and John D Graham set up this business to make custom automobile bodies on the west side of New York City in 1908. Holbrook left the business in 1913 and Jack Graham became sole owner and began attracting more orders from Packard's New York branch. The growing order book demanded more shop space and though extra premises were found a mile away it became necessary to move bodies from one shop to the other to get them finished.

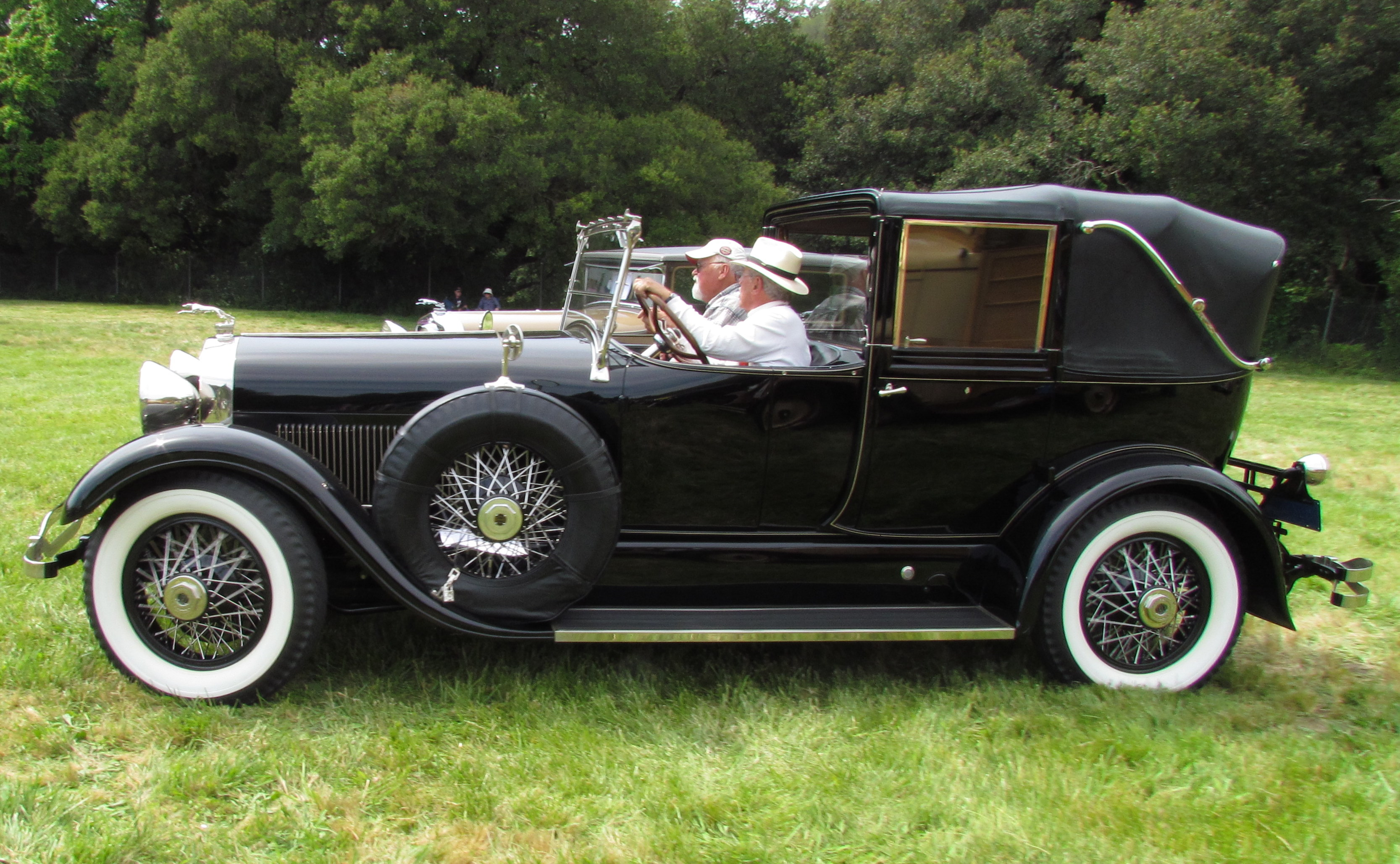
Open-drive town landau body on a 1928 Lincoln chassis

== Hudson, New York ==
After World War I the right new location was found in 1921 about 100 miles north of New York in Hudson, New York and the factory was moved there. The Packard bodies were generally town cars and limousines but they built a line of 100 coupés for Packard. They also built some notable phaetons for display at Automobile Salons.

The New York businessmen who had provided the financial support for Holbrook were unable to continue the loans after the Wall Street crash of 1929. Holbrook entered bankruptcy in May 1930. Some Holbrook assets were bought by Rollston.
