= Jean Kane Foulke du Pont =

- Born: Jean Kane Foulke; May 21, 1891; Lenape, Pennsylvania, US
- Died: November 6, 1985 (aged 94); Montchanin, Delaware, US
- Occupations: Activist, philanthropist
- Spouse: Éleuthère Paul du Pont
- Relatives: William Foulke (grandfather)

Jean Kane Foulke du Pont (May 21, 1891 – November 6, 1985) was an American suffragette, prison reform activist and philanthropist.

== Biography ==
Jean Kane Foulke was born in West Chester, Lenape, Pennsylvania to George Rhyfedd Foulke and Jean (Kane) Foulke. She was the granddaughter of William Foulke, who discovered the first full dinosaur skeleton in North America (Hadrosaurus foulkii), in Haddonfield, New Jersey, in 1858.

She grew up in West Chester, at Bala Farm and attended the Misses Hebb's School in Wilmington, Delaware. She married industrialist Éleuthère Paul du Pont on June 9, 1910. Her husband was a member of the prominent Du Pont family and the founder of Du Pont Motors. They had six sons: Éleuthère Paul, Jr. (1911); Francis George (1913); Stephen (1915); Benjamin Bonneau (1919); Robert Jacques (1923); and Alexis Irénée (1928). Stephen, an aviation enthusiast, was inducted into the Soaring Hall of Fame in 1987.

Her Great-Great-Great Grandnephew is Brandon Kane Guerra Roszel.

== Activism ==
Foulke du Pont was a progressive woman for her era, and her passion was prison reform; in 1919 she helped found The Prisoners' Aid Society of Delaware as well as Bridge House, a detention home for juvenile offenders in the Browntown section of Wilmington, that was open until 1989.

Foulke du Pont was exceedingly active in the women's suffrage movement; in 1916 she picketed the White House with a troop of Delaware women in an effort to persuade President Woodrow Wilson to become active in the cause.

During World War I, Foulke du Pont was a leader in the Women's Auxiliary for the Delaware Committee, as well as the Council of National Defense. She was also responsible for several "Save the Babies" stations, which resulted in Delaware's "Pure Milk Legislation" intended to protect milk sold for babies, and also led to child welfare programs in Delaware. Foulke du Pont also played an important role in the creation of Delaware's present Family Court. There is a plaque in her honor at the Family Court in Wilmington, dedicated in 1963.

In 1964, she contacted the University of Delaware seeking a training and educational program for the Delaware's correctional workers, to benefit those "working in probation, parole, family court, and youth services, as well as the guards in state prisons."

She created a $400,000 endowment (equivalent of $3 million in 2014) in honor of her husband, the "E. Paul du Pont Endowment for the Study of Crime, Delinquency, and Corrections," if the university agreed to train the correctional personnel. She also donated a 10-year grant to encourage the university faculty to study prison reform and prisoner rehabilitation issues through the sociology department. This eventually led to the university's criminal justice program. She also made additional yearly donations to the sociology department to study social welfare.
