= John B. Judkins Company =

Automobile body manufacturer

The John B. Judkins Company of West Amesbury, Massachusetts, carriage and automobile body manufacturers built their first automobiles in the 1890s. West Amesbury, since re-named Merrimac, was an early center of American carriage-building.

== Carriageworks established ==
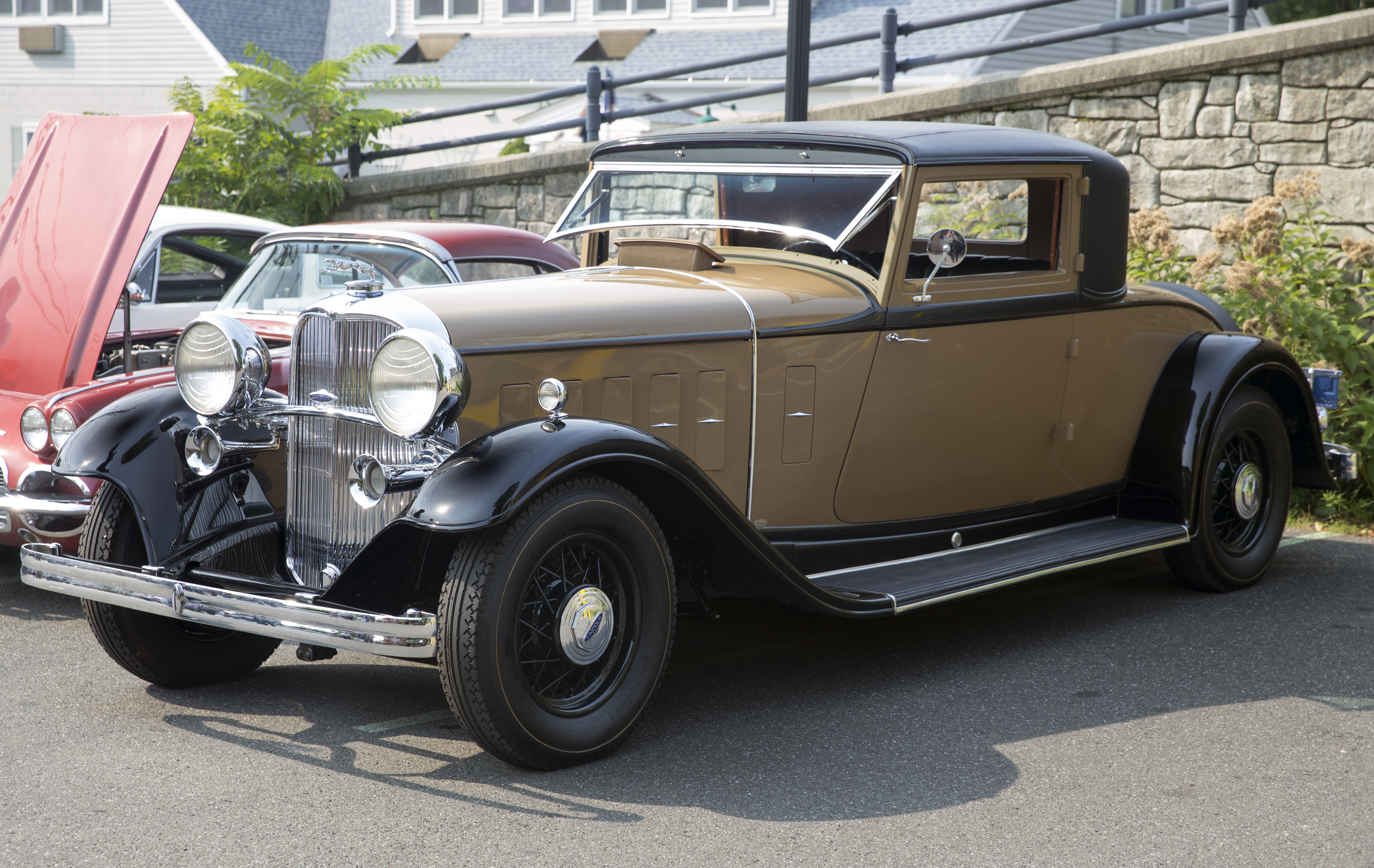
1932 Lincoln Model K by Judkins

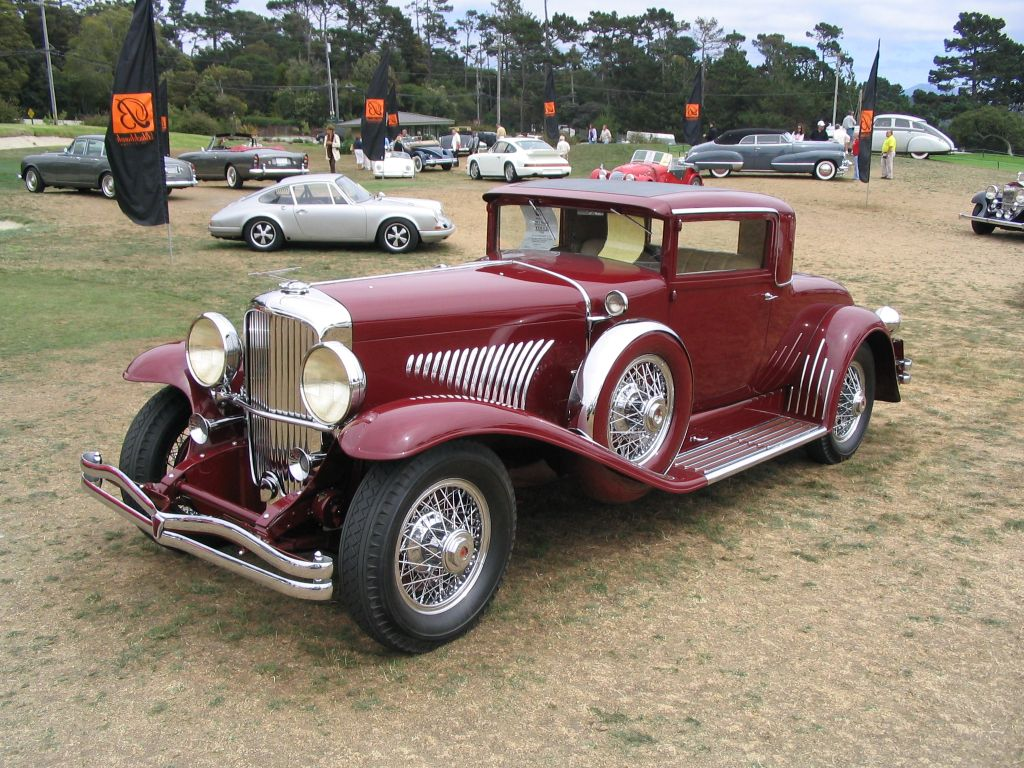
1932 Duesenberg J coupé by Judkins

John B. Judkins and Isaac Little established themselves in Amesbury as coachbuilders in 1857. Various new partners joined with Judkins and the firm's name changed to match but eventually two Judkins sons took charge after their father died in 1908.

=== Packard ===
Boston's Packard distributor, Alvan T Fuller, bought special bodies for the new Packard Twin Sixes that Packard put into production in 1915.

=== Lincoln ===
They also built coupés and berlines for Lincoln during the 1920s and during the Great Depression.

=== Trailers ===
During the 1930s Judkins added trailers to their product line.

1938 saw their last coachbuilt body and in 1941 trailer production stopped and the business was liquidated.
