= Willoughby Company =

Defunct American motor vehicle body manufacturer

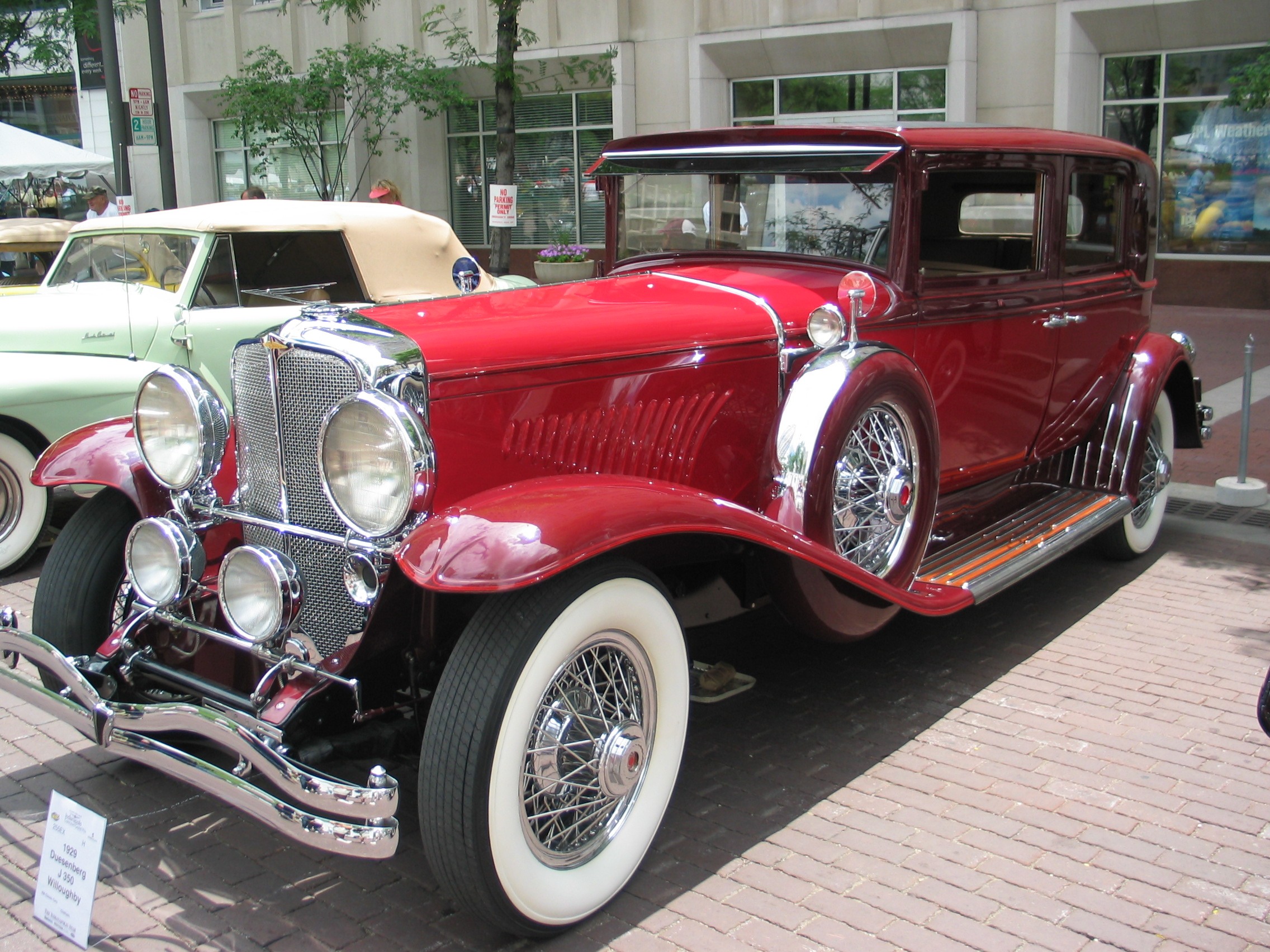
Sedan-limousine on a 1929 Duesenberg Model J chassis

Willoughby Company was a custom coachbuilding business in Utica, New York. The Willoughby family had been building carriages in Rome, New York for some generations but set up in Utica when they added town cars and limousines to their products. Though always building custom cars Willoughby also built relatively expensive car bodies in small production runs.

By the mid 1920s they had dropped the productions runs and restricted output to custom bodies.

The Utica business was begun by Francis Willoughby who died in 1908. His son Francis D Willoughby who had been gaining experience working for competitors took over from his father and was responsible for its most prosperous period.

Their styling was conservative but they had a high reputation for fine quality upholstery.

Bodies on Lincoln chassis for Edsel Ford kept Willoughby in business during the early 1930s but they finally closed in 1938.
