= E. Paul du Pont =

American businessman

Eleuthère Paul du Pont

President of Indian Motorcycles
- In office 1930–1950

Personal details
- Born: April 24, 1887 New Castle, Delaware
- Died: September 26, 1950 (aged 63) Wilmington, Delaware

Eleuthère Paul du Pont (April 24, 1887 – September 26, 1950) was an American business magnate and the son of Francis Gurney du Pont. He founded Du Pont Motors, a manufacturer of automobiles and marine engines, and later bought and became president of Indian Motorcycles. He was inducted into the Motorcycle Hall of Fame in 2004.

== Biography ==
E. Paul du Pont was born on April 24, 1887, in New Castle, Delaware. He married in 1910 to Jean Kane Foulke du Pont, the granddaughter of William Foulke, discoverer of the first full dinosaur skeleton in the United States (Hadrosaurus foulkii), in Haddonfield, New Jersey, in 1858.

He purchased and took over management of Indian Motorcycles in 1930, where he led a purge of corruption in the prior management and refocused production and marketing on leisure use. According to the Motorcycle Hall of Fame in Ohio, du Pont saved Indian from financial ruin.

He was an avid hobbyist of waterwheels and millwork, and is said to have insisted upon always performing maintenance personally on the ornamental waterwheel in the gardens of the du Pont family estate.

He died on September 26, 1950, in Wilmington, Delaware.

== Legacy ==
After E. Paul du Pont's death, his wife founded the E. Paul du Pont Endowment for the Study of Crime, Delinquency, and Corrections at the University of Delaware, which led to the creation of its criminal justice program.
