= Brunn & Company =

Defunct American motor vehicle manufacturer

Brunn & Company was an American coachbuilding business founded in 1908 by carriage designer Hermann A. Brunn (1874–1941) in Buffalo, New York. He was the father of Hermann C. (1908–1989) who initially worked for his father, then was employed by the Ford Motor Company after Brunn & Company closed in 1941. Hermann A. Brunn also had an uncle named Henry Brunn who founded a second coachwork company in Buffalo called Brunn Carriage Mfg Co. Much of their work was for Lincoln Motor Cars after being purchased by the Ford Motor Company in 1922.

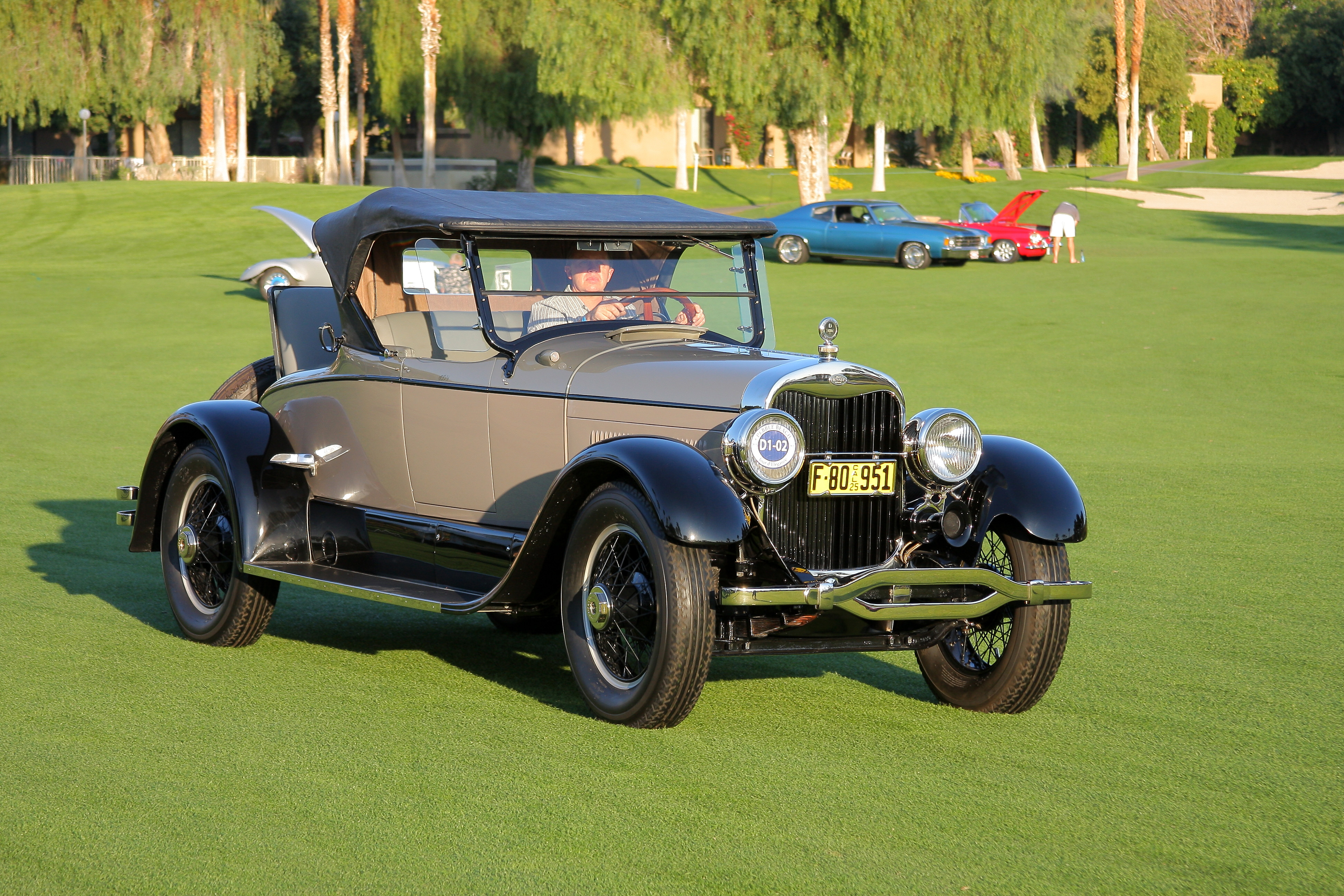
1925 Lincoln Model L

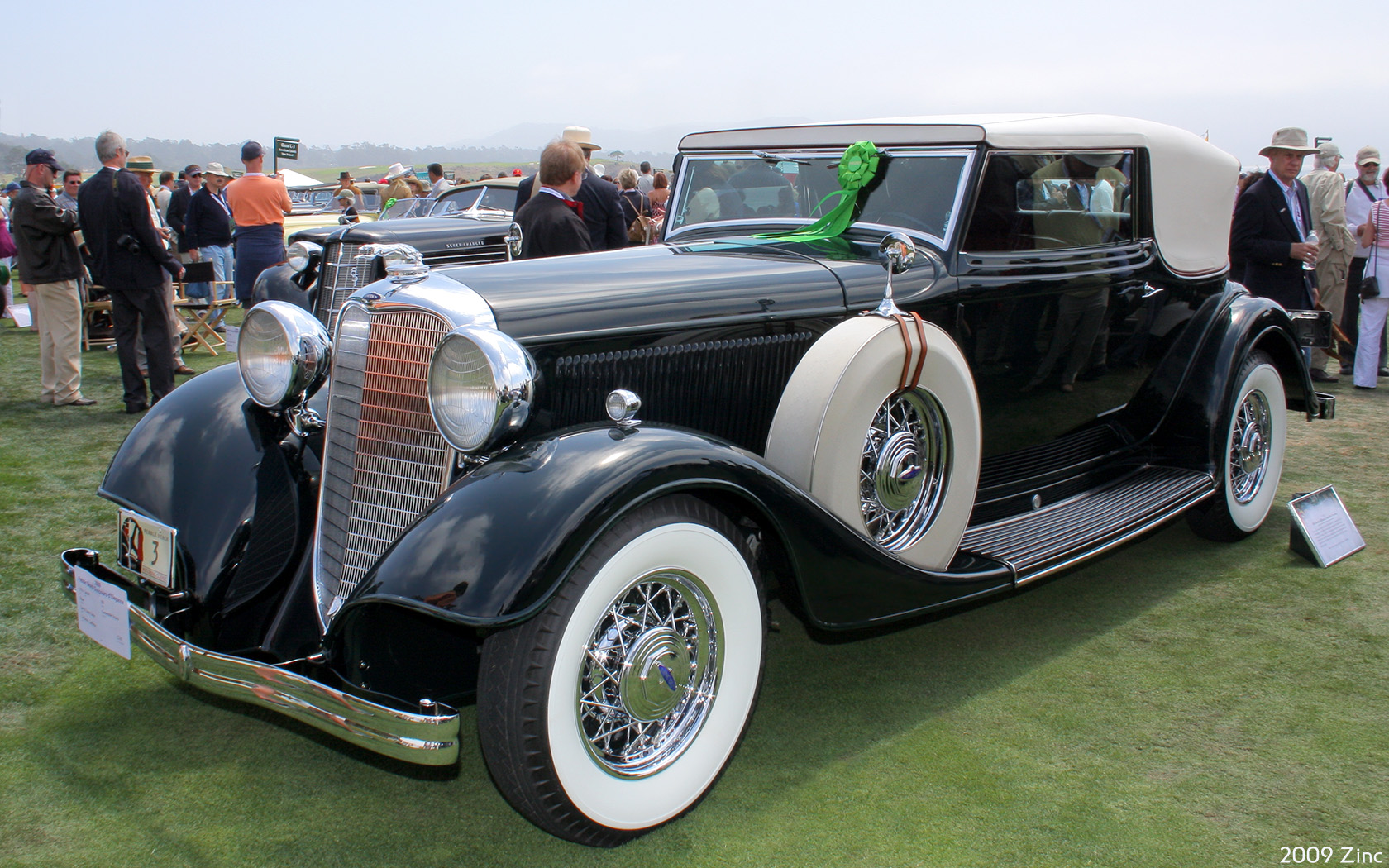
1933 Lincoln Model KB

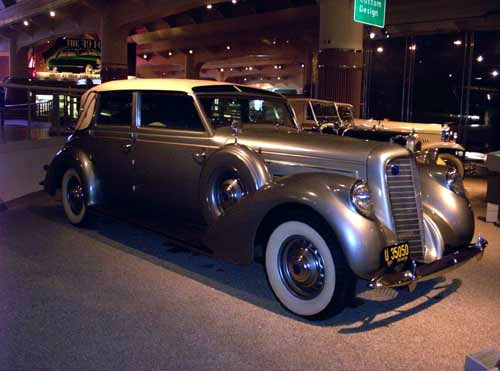
1937 Lincoln Model K

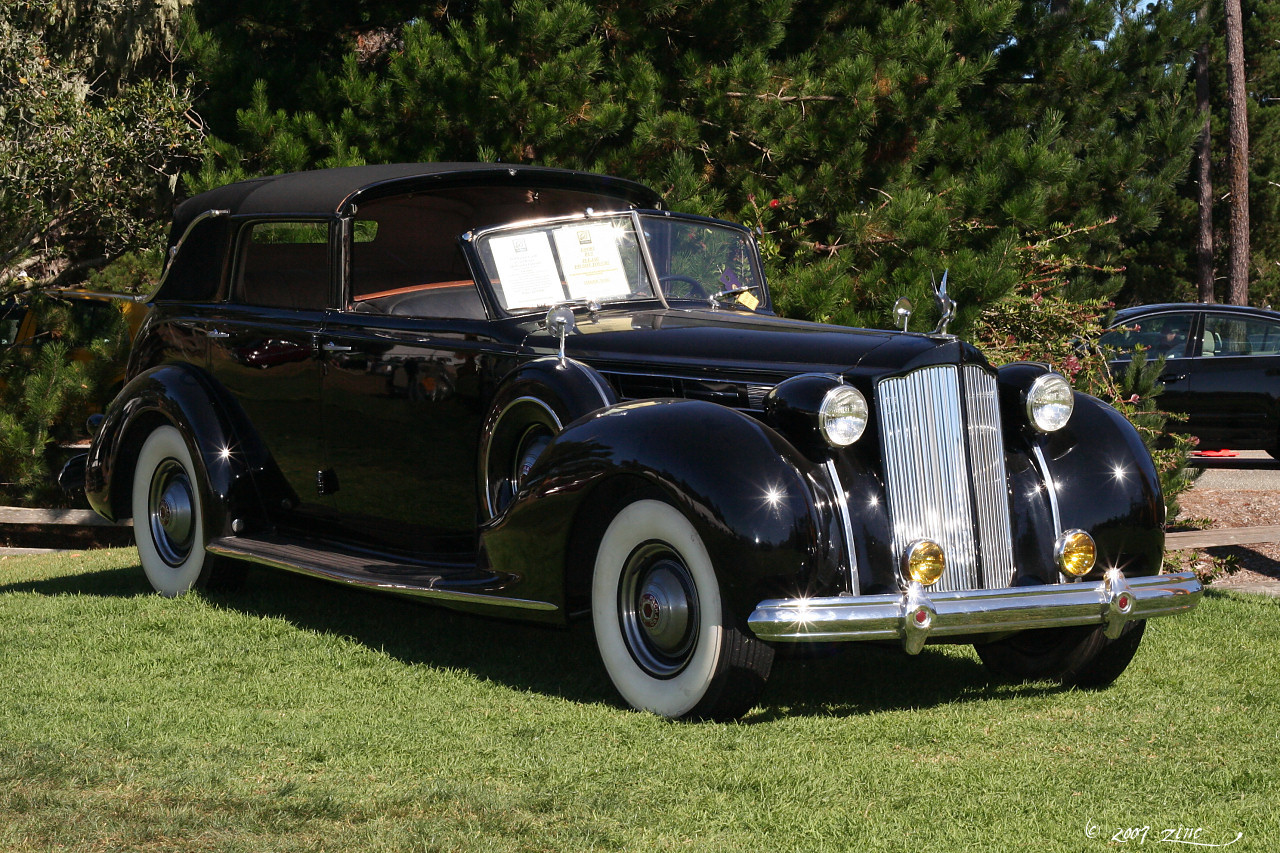
1938 Sixteenth Series Packard Twelve Model 1608

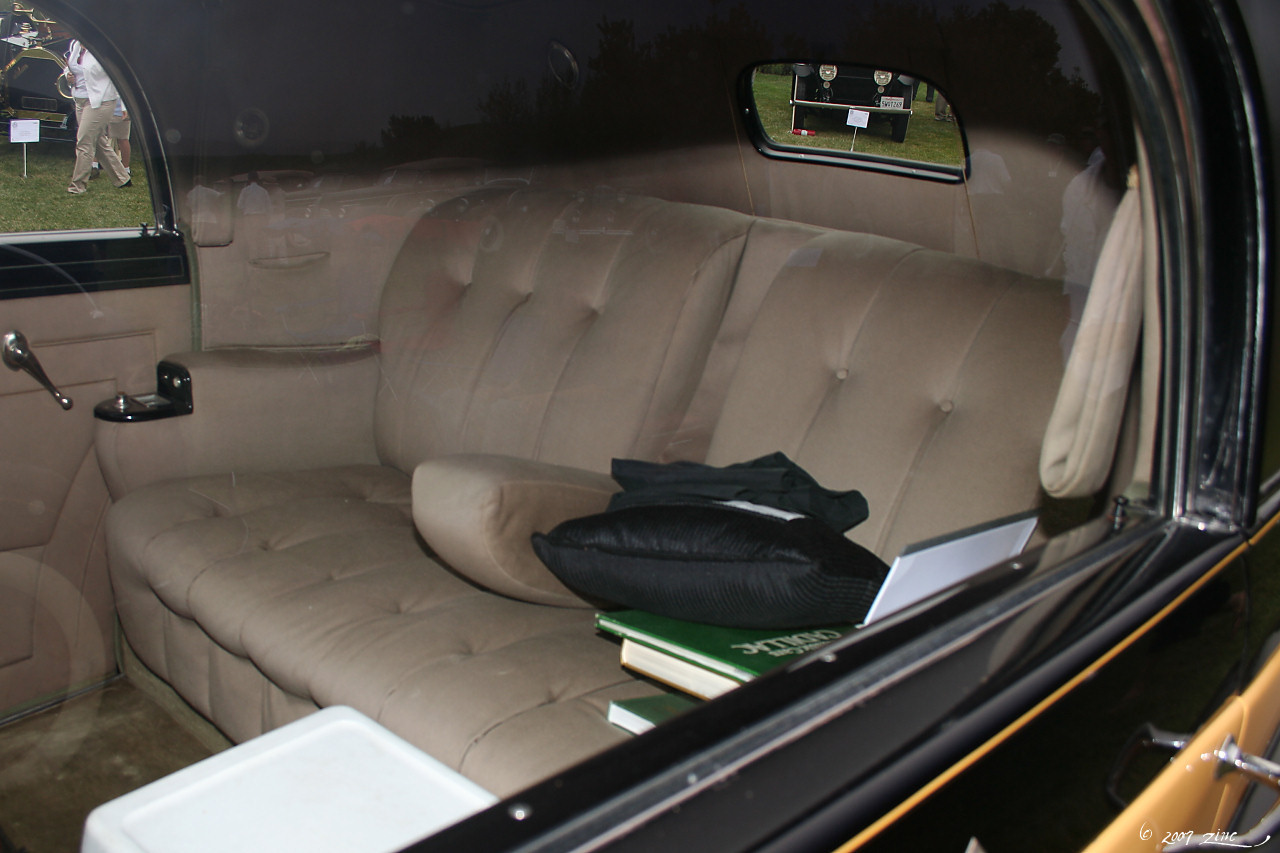
1940 Cadillac Series 75
