= Du Pont Motors =

Defunct American motor vehicle manufacturer

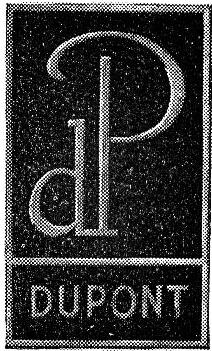
- Industry: Automotive
- Founded: 1919
- Founder: Eleuthere Paul du Pont
- Defunct: 1932
- Fate: Merged into the Indian Motorcycle Company
- Headquarters: Wilmington, Delaware (1919–1923); Moore Township, Pennsylvania (1923–1932), United States
- Area served: United States
- Products: Vehicles; Automotive parts

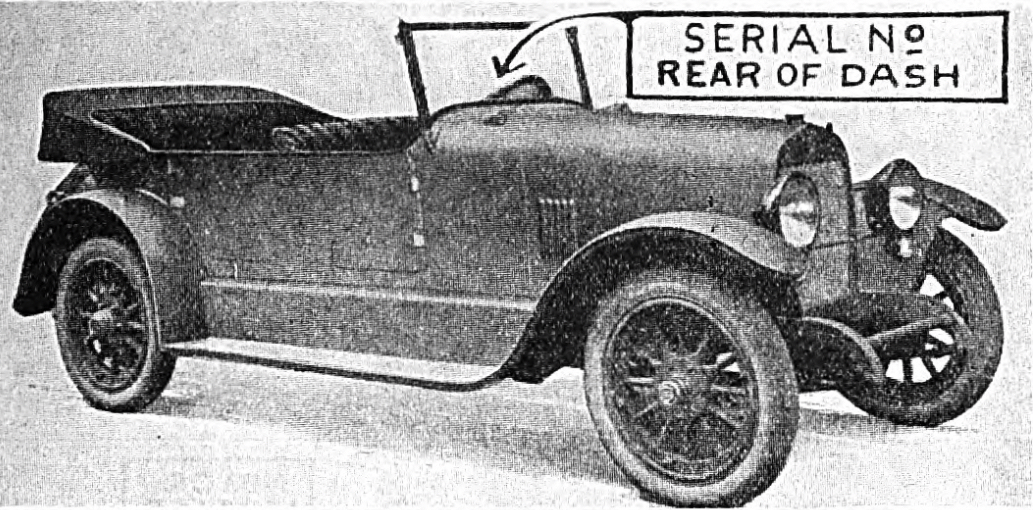
Dupont A-5 Touring (1921)

Du Pont Motors was founded by E. Paul du Pont to produce marine engines for the Allied nations during World War I. After the war, Du Pont Motors produced extremely high-end automobiles. The cars were manufactured in Wilmington, Delaware.

E. Paul du Pont's resources allowed him to hire top-quality automotive and management talent. The company's first product, the Model A, was introduced at the 1919 International Salon at the Commodore Hotel in New York City (an event for the wealthy by invitation only, along with the finest manufacturers and coach builders). The Model G was introduced in 1928, with a 5.3 liter side-valve straight eight engine of 125 hp (93 kW).

Between 1919 and 1931, the company produced approximately 625 automobiles. They were compared to such luxury cars as Packard, Cadillac and even Stutz, and Duesenberg, and were known for their quality and style. Customers included Mary Pickford and Douglas Fairbanks, Will Rogers, and Jack Dempsey.

The company went bankrupt in 1932 and merged into the Indian Motorcycle Company when E. Paul du Pont purchased the latter company.

== Du Pont Model A ==
The first model, Type A, was produced from 1919 to 1922 in various body versions. As a two-seater A-2 Roadster, as a five-seater A-5 Touring, as an A Sedan, and from 1922 as an A Coupe. The four-cylinder engine of type A had 4091 cc with a bore of 100 mm and a stroke of 130.175 mm. For the Roadster, the serial numbers from 1 to 150 were reserved. For the touring, the serial numbers from 150 to 400 are reserved. For the sedan, the serial numbers were from 400 to 500. The coupe serial numbers load above 500.

== Du Pont model G ==
The Du Pont Model G was the first 8 cylinder model from Du Pont Motors in Wilmington, Delaware.

The car was powered by a Continental 12-K side-valve straight eight cylinder engine with a displacement of 321.8 c.i. (5.3 litre), delivering 125 bhp. Du Pont added an aluminum cover over the distributor, spark plugs and wiring for water and dust protection. There was a 3 speed transmission. Included were four-wheel hydraulic brakes, and hydraulic shock absorbers. Standard wheelbase was 136 in., with 141 in. available for formal coachwork, and a speedster with 125 in. There were 12 factory body styles to choose from, manufactured for Du Pont by Merrimac, Derham, and Waterhouse. The rolling chassis was available for other coachbuilders. Prices ranged from US$4,360 ($81,750 in 2025 dollars) to US$5,750 ($107,813 in 2025 dollars), with Speedsters up to US$6,125 ($114,844 in 2025 dollars).

A 1930 Du Pont Model G Merrimac Town Car won the Best of Show award in the 1958 Pebble Beach Concours d'Elegance.

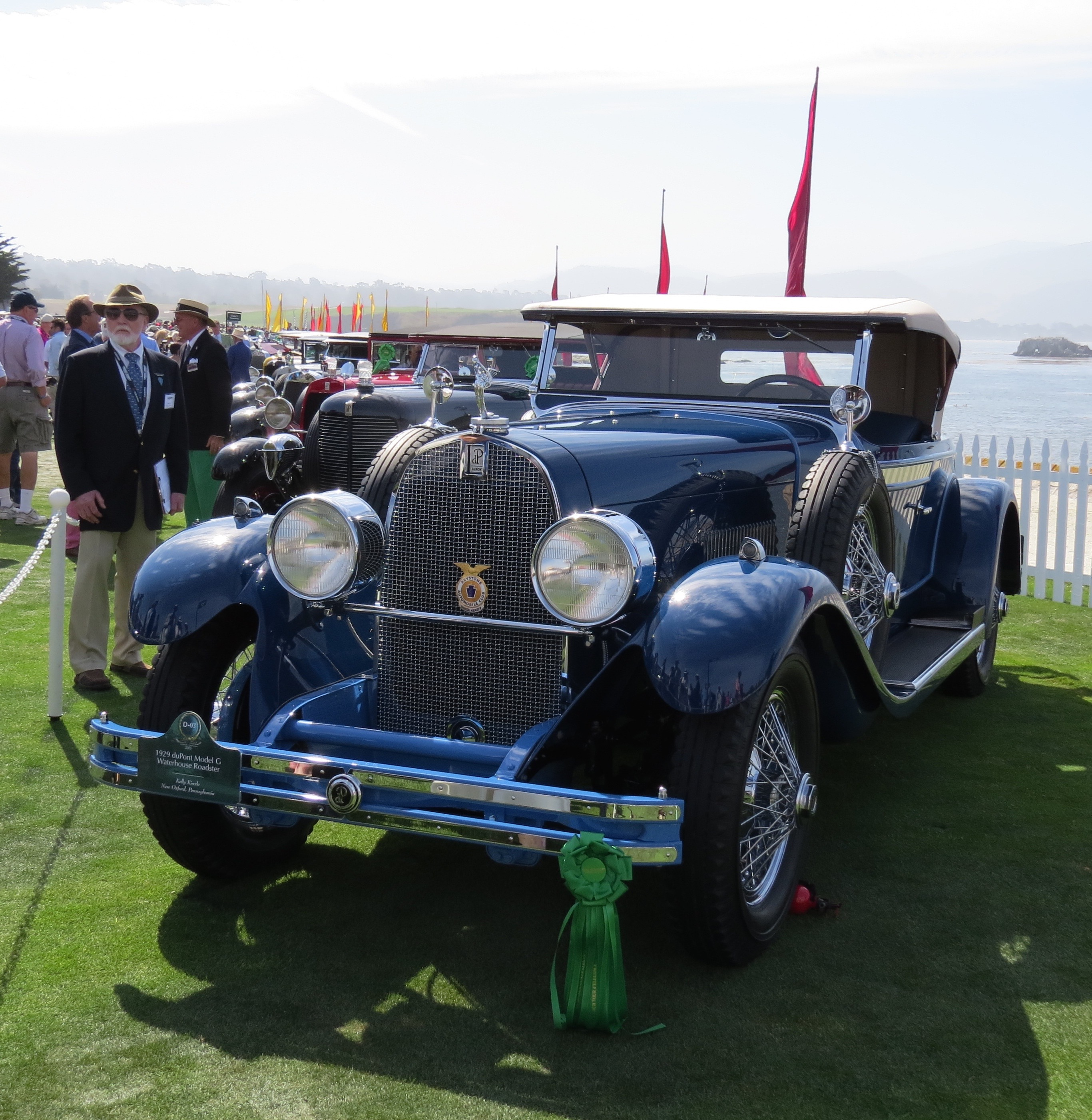
1929 Du Pont Model G Waterhouse Roadster

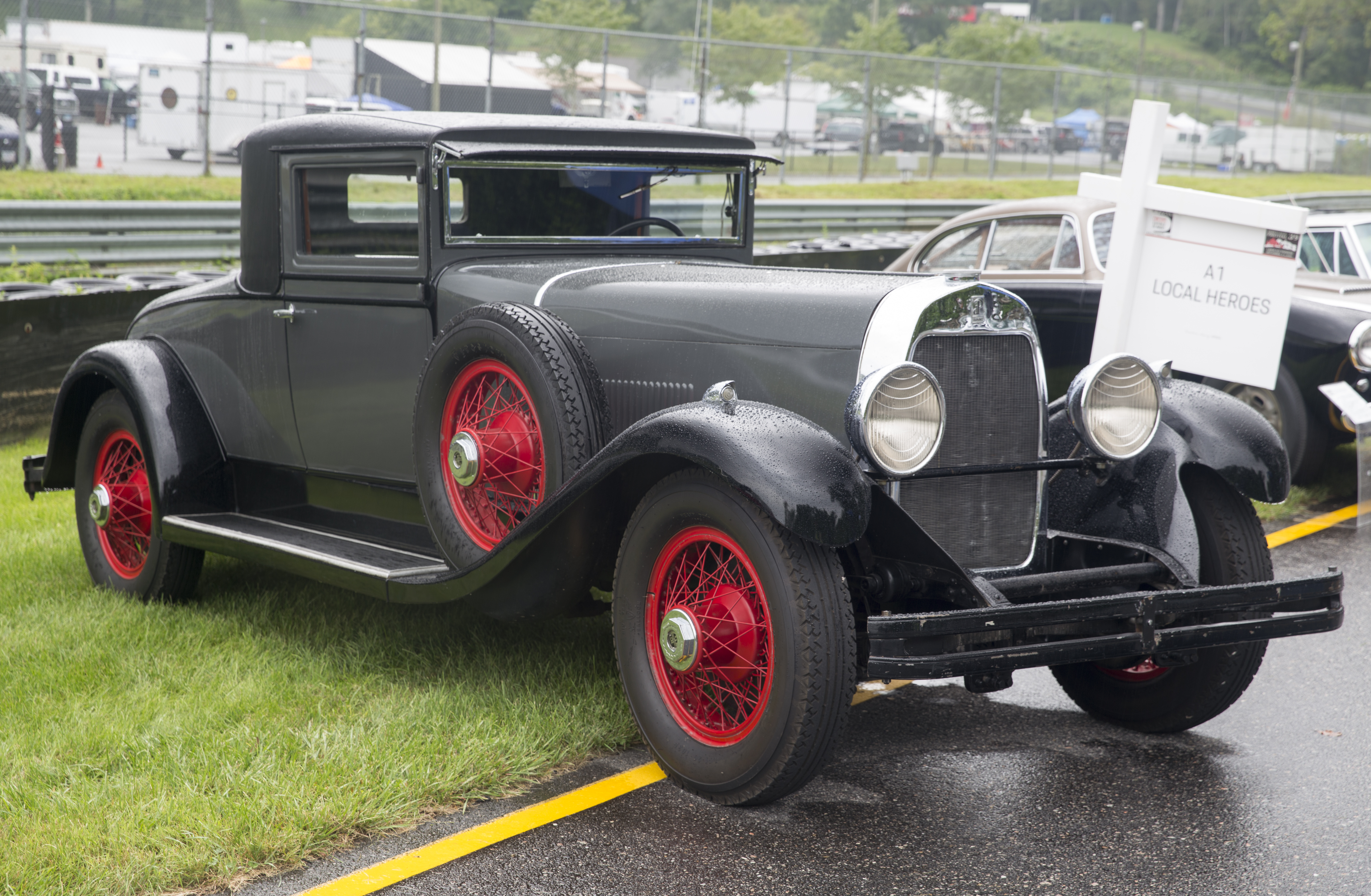
1929 Du Pont Model G Merrimac Club Coupe

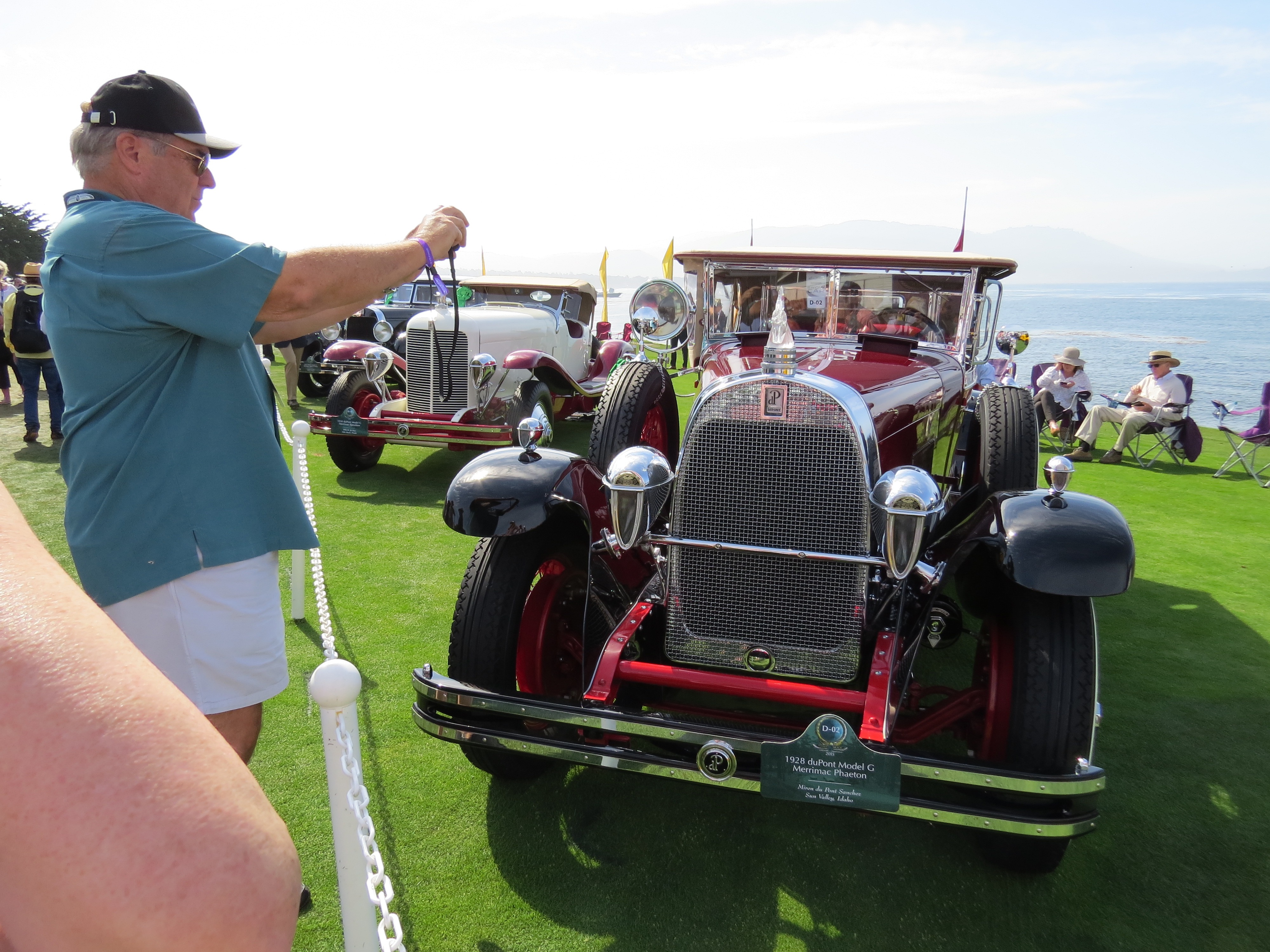
1928 Du Pont Model G Phaeton by Merrimac

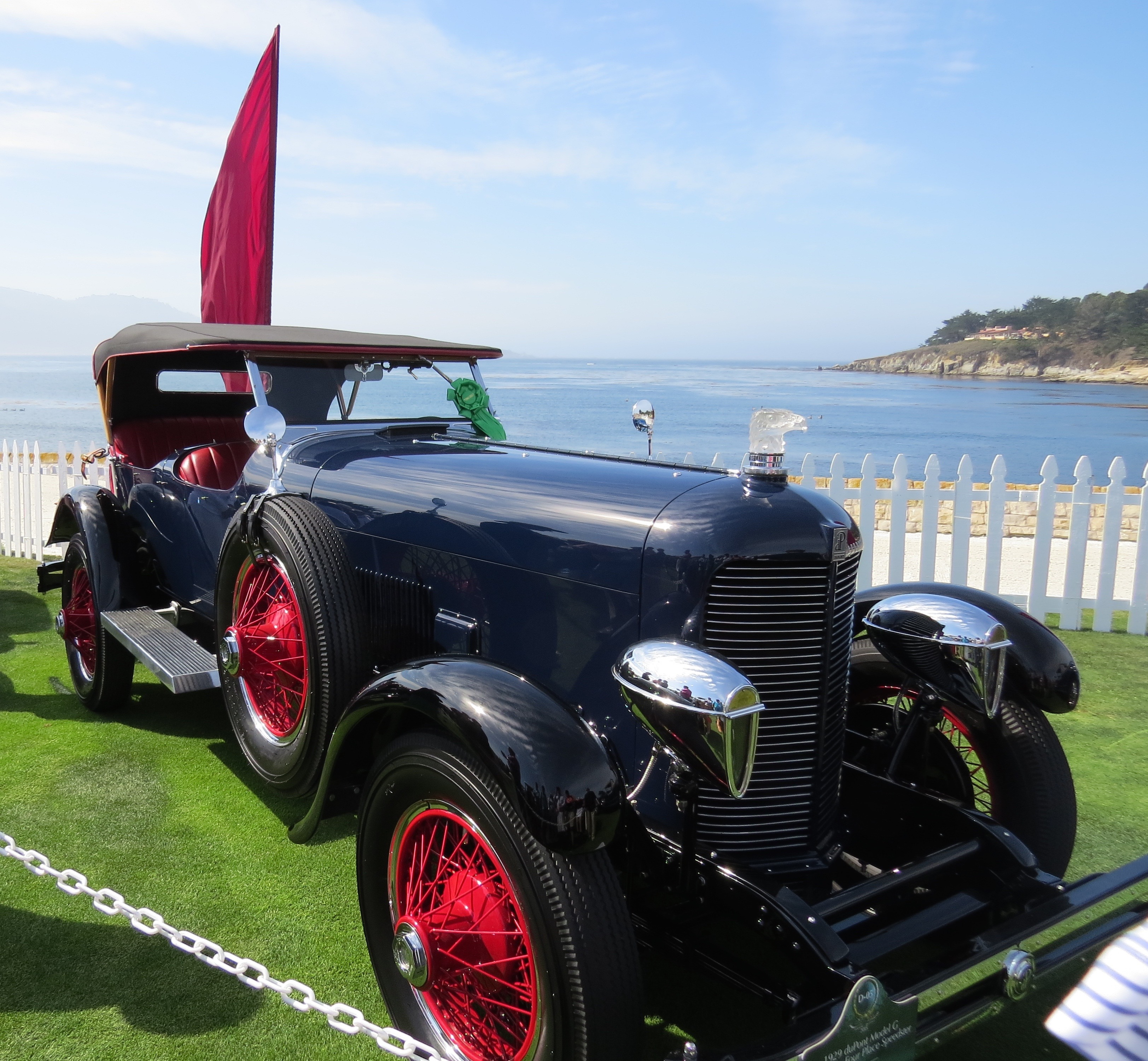
1929 Du Pont Model G Waterhouse Convertible Victoria

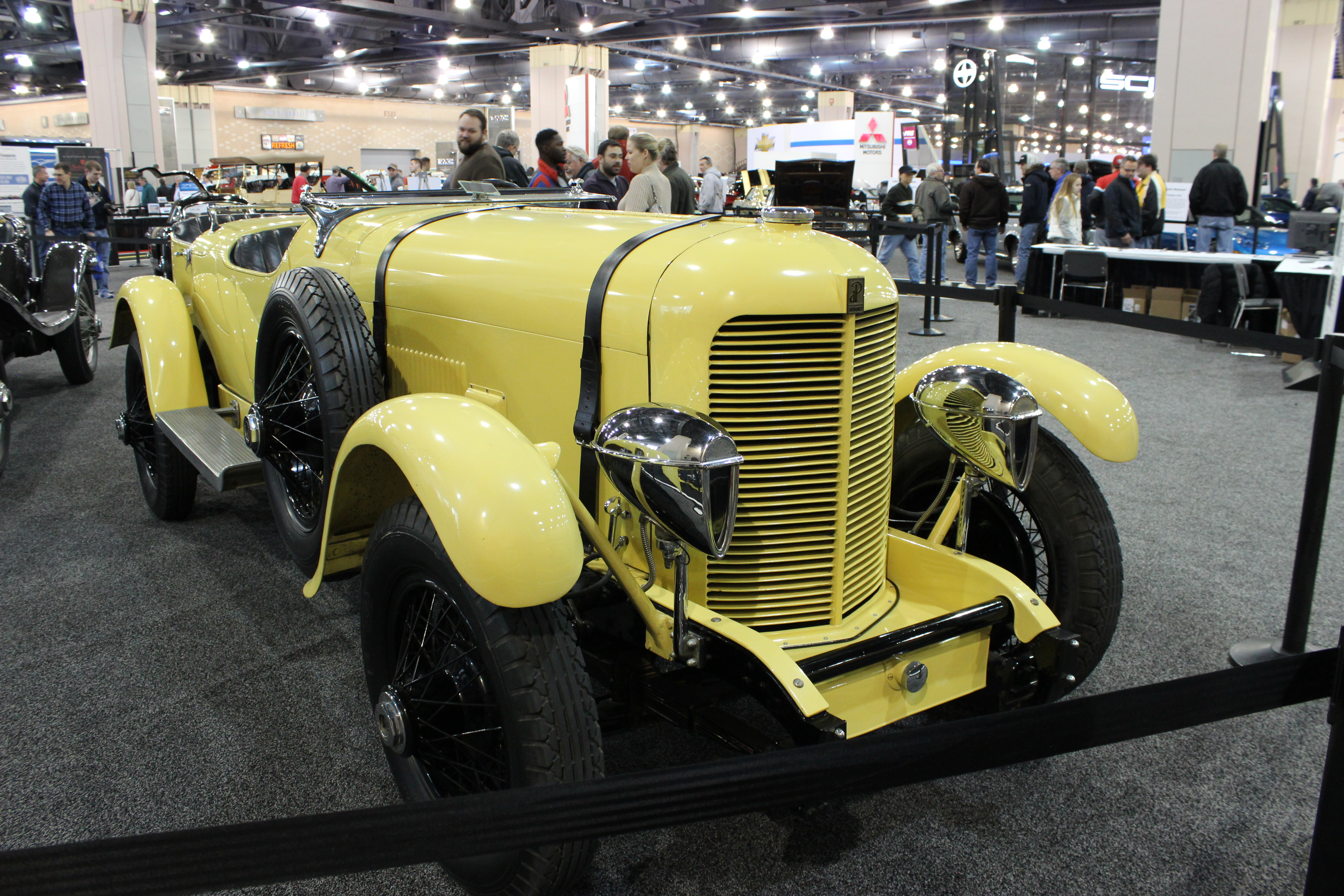
1929 Du Pont Model G Le Mans Speedster by Merrimac

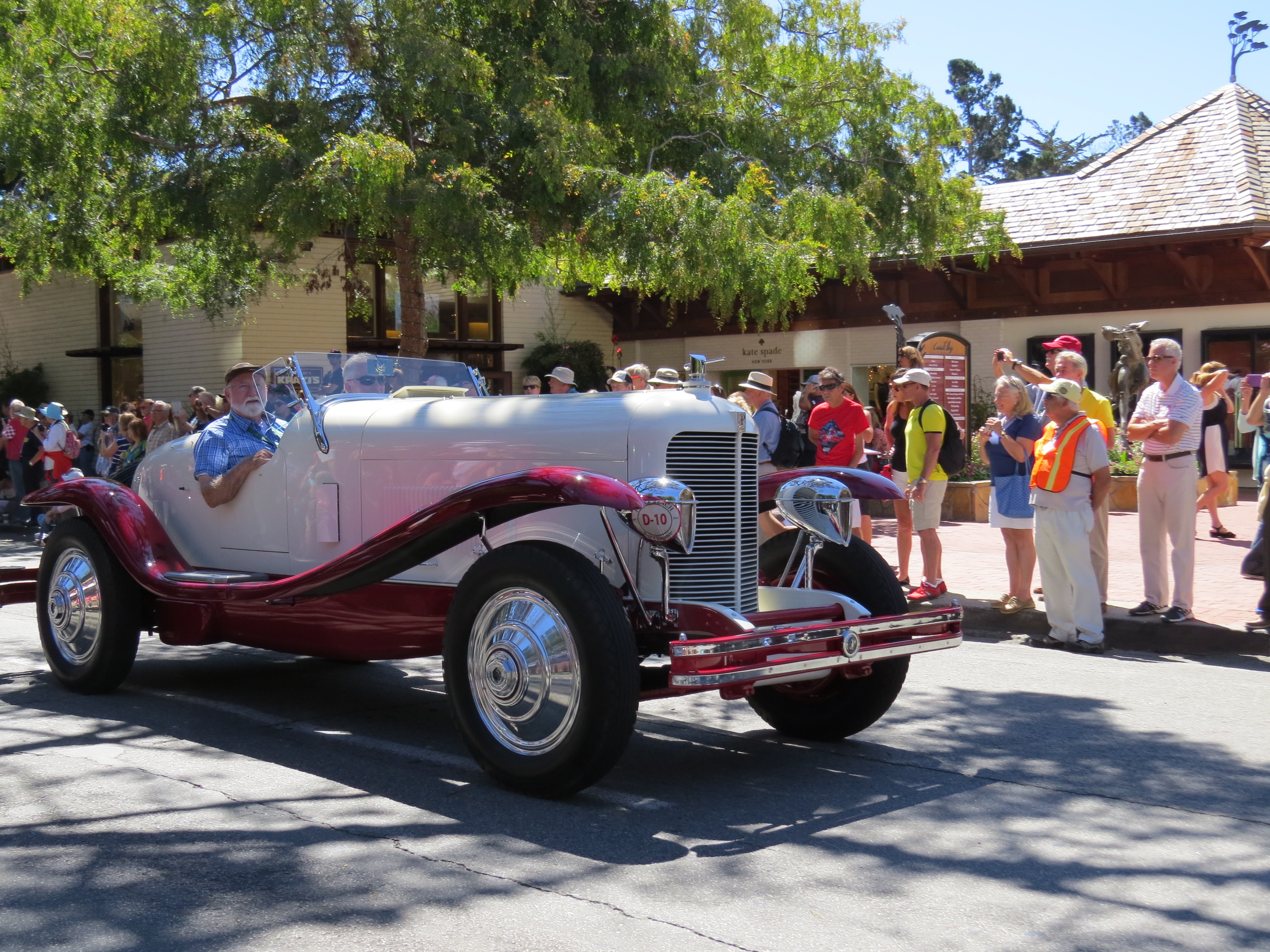
1930 DuPont Model G Merrimac Speedster

== Du Pont model H ==
The Du Pont Model H was the last motor car line for Du Pont Motors. In 1930 the Model H was introduced, which was basically a Model G but with a longer wheelbase that measured 146-inches. A total of three were built consisting of a two car and two sport models. The sports chassis were later bodied as a sport phaeton and a closed-coupled sedan by Dietrich. The other received a formal Berline body and a flat radiator.

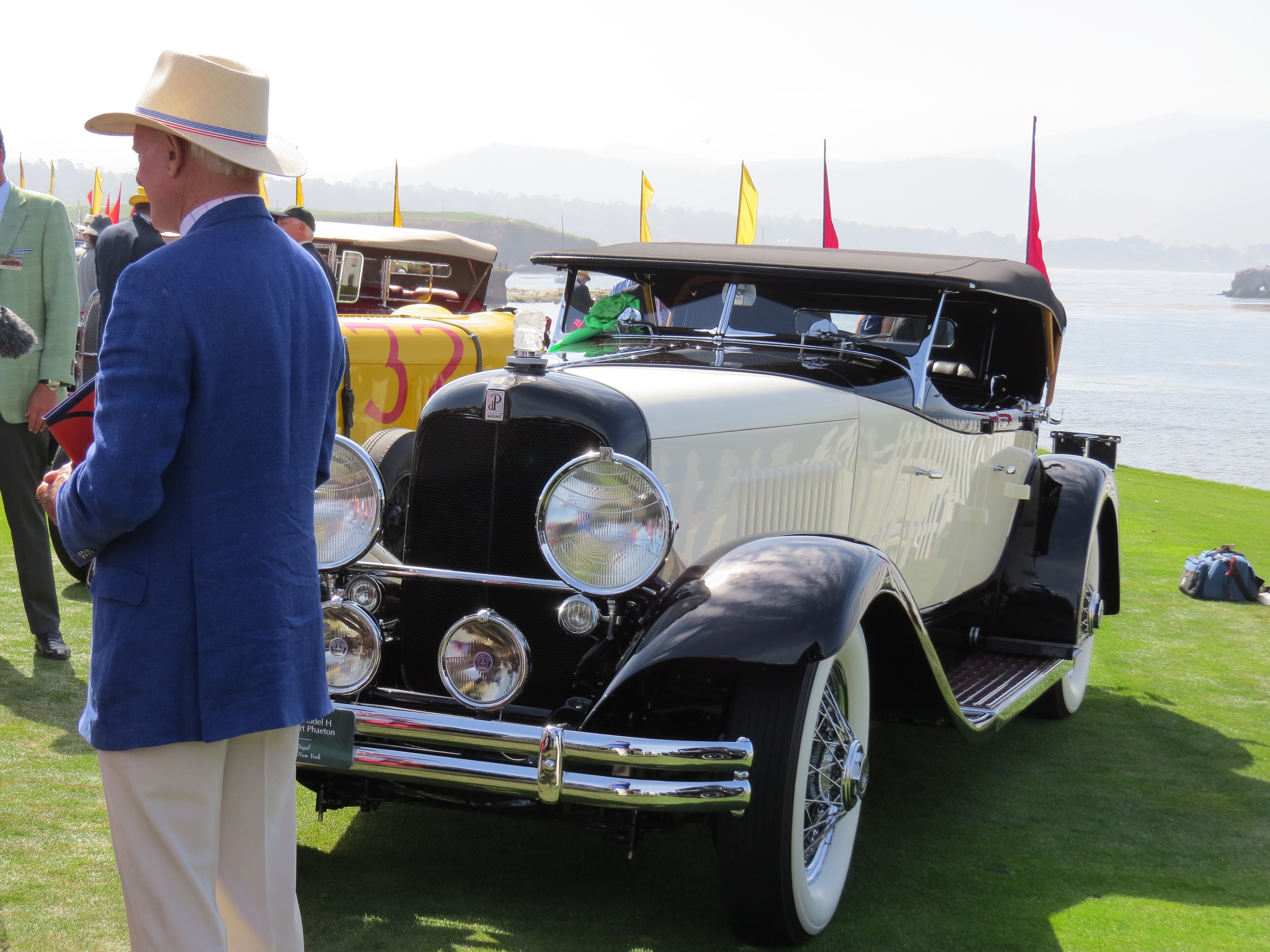
1931 DuPont Model H Sport Phaeton by Merrimac-Marshall. (One of three Model H built)

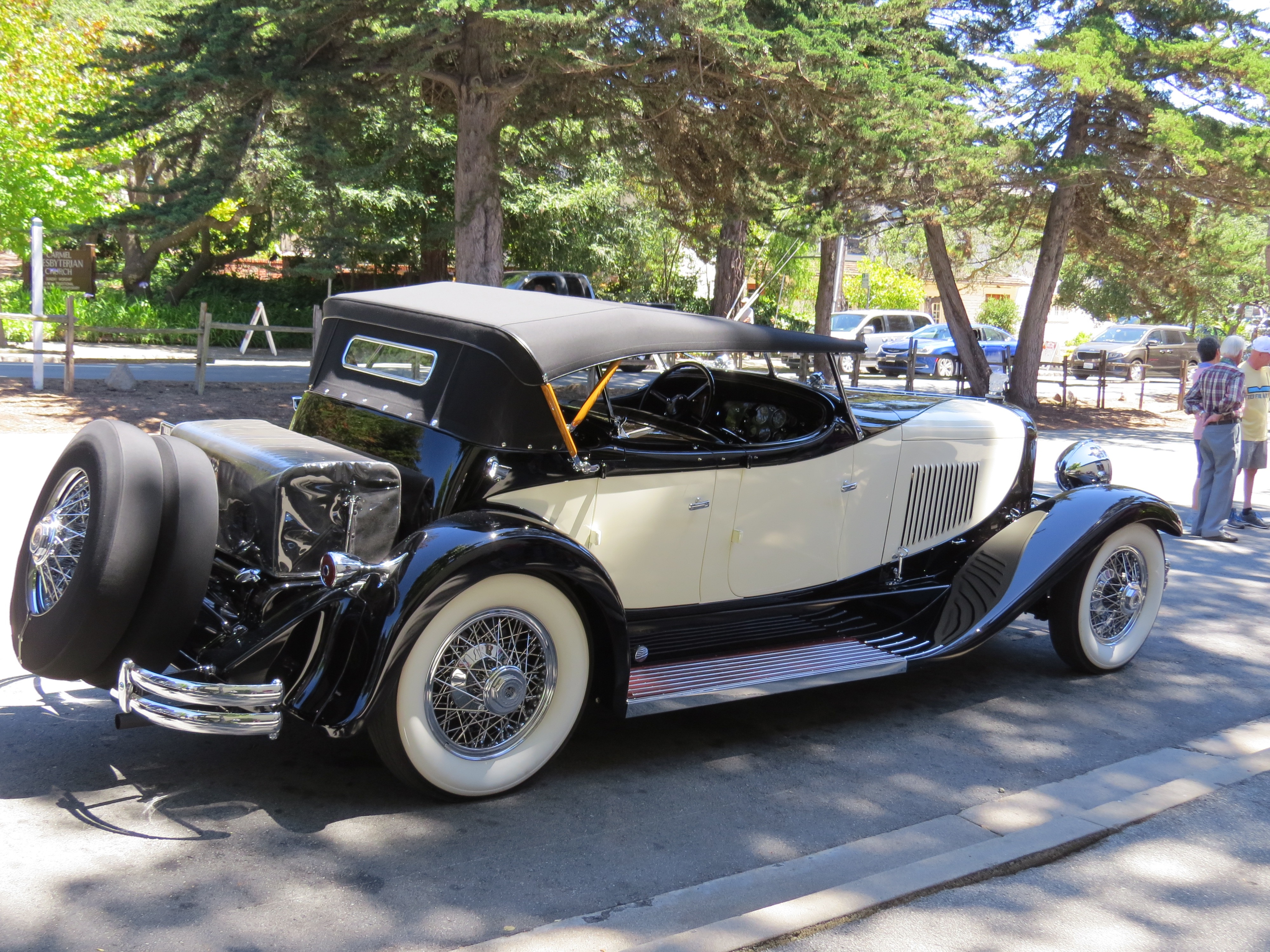
1931 Du Pont Model H Sport Phaeton by Merrimac-Marshall

== See also ==
- Du Pont family
- Indian (motorcycle)
- List of defunct United States automobile manufacturers
- History of the automobile
