= Waterhouse Company =

Defunct American motor vehicle body manufacturer

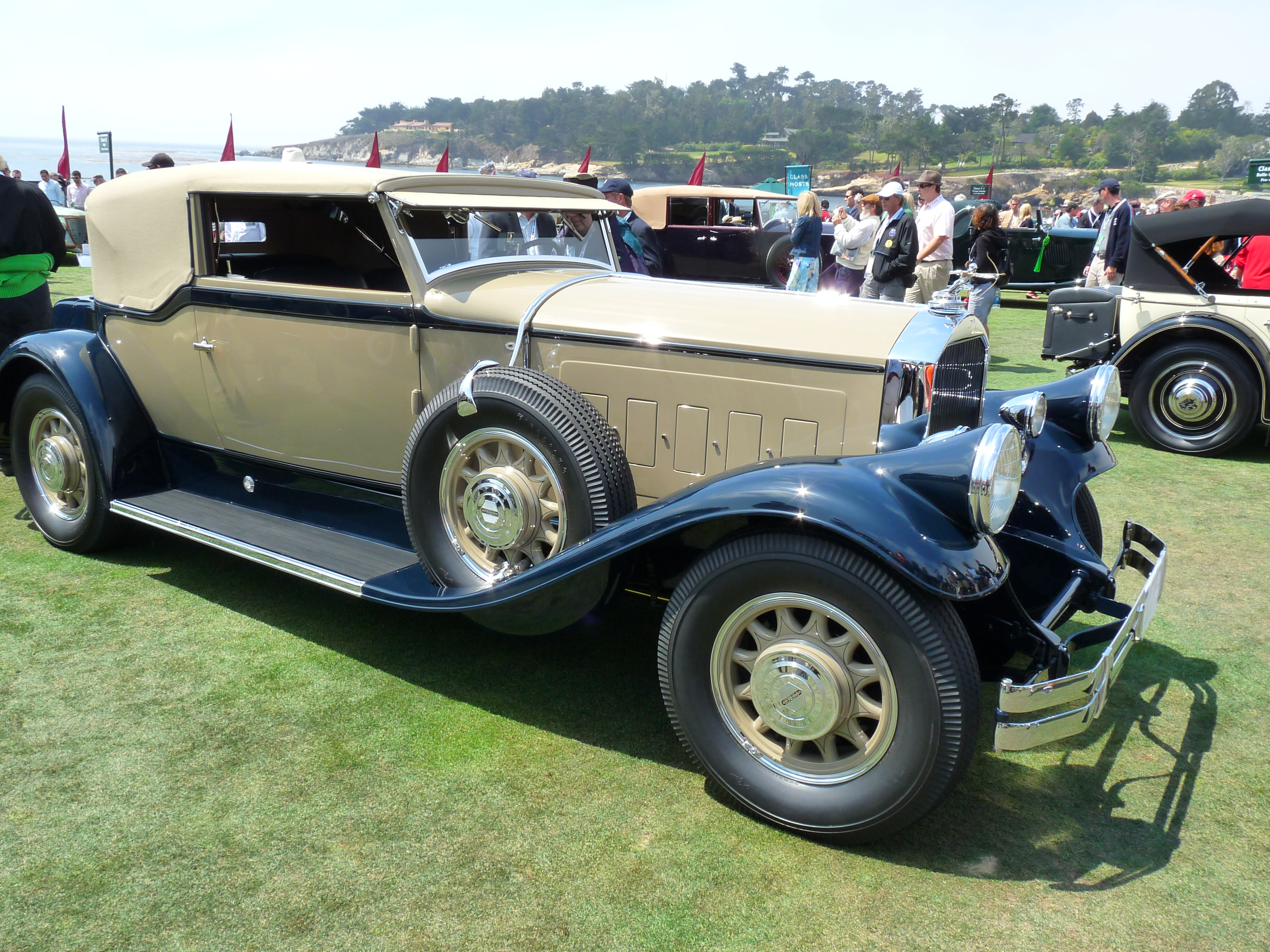
Convertible Victoria on a 1930 Pierce-Arrow B chassis

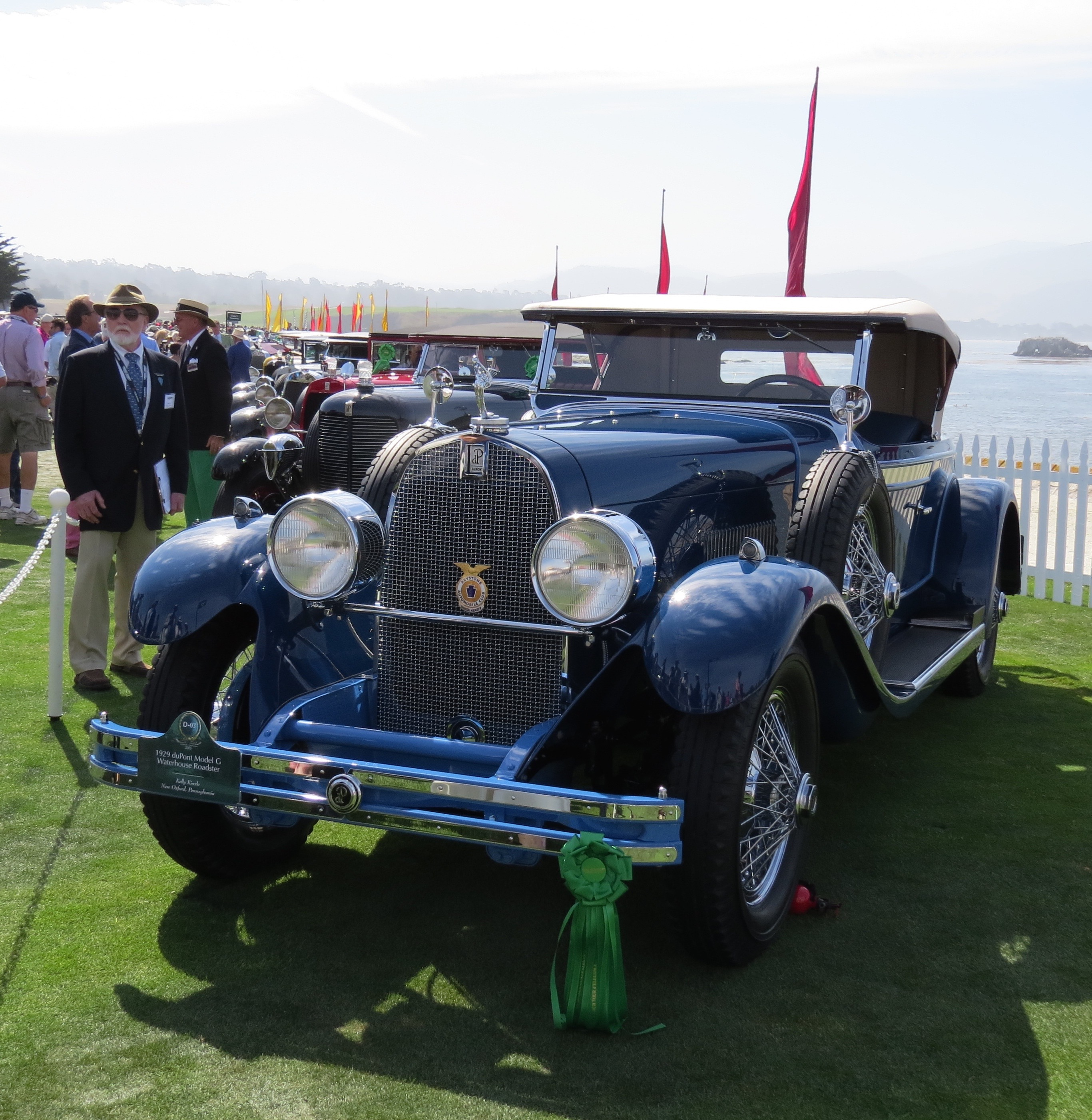
Roadster on a 1929 Du Pont Model G chassis

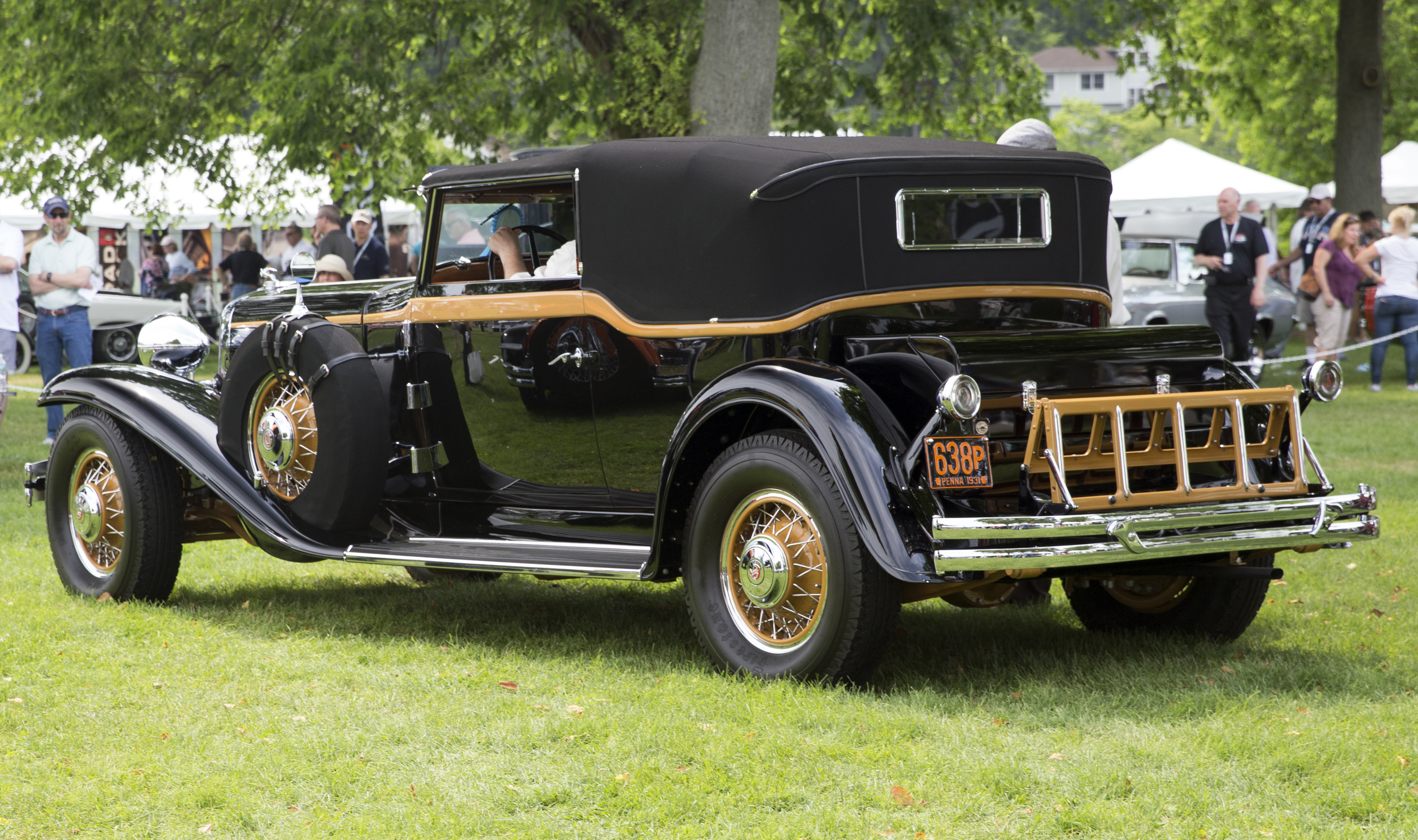
Convertible Victoria on a 1931 Chrysler Imperial CG chassis

The Waterhouse Company of Webster, Massachusetts were coachbuilders making high quality custom bodies for chassis supplied by the major automotive businesses.

Waterhouse was founded in 1928 by Charles L Waterhouse (1870-1953) with his sons Moses Sargent Waterhouse and Lewis Osbourne Waterhouse. Charles L Waterhouse senior had been a key employee at Judkins and the brothers had spent some years there.

When demand was high in 1929 they received an order from Packard's export department for a car to be exhibited at the Paris salon. It was a very short notice order which no other coachbuilder would accept. The new body attracted the attention of Packard's president and orders for duplicates followed.

The doors were closed on the coachbuilding section in 1933 but they continued to make small boats and during World War 2 supplied marine ordnance and, after the war, furniture.

Waterhouse also put their custom bodies on Pierce-Arrow, Lincoln, Du Pont, Chrysler, Marmon and Stutz.
