= Packard Twelve =

Ultra-luxury flagship automobiles

Overview
- Manufacturer: Packard
- Model years: 1916–1923; 1932–1939
- Assembly: Packard Automotive Plant, Detroit, Michigan, United States

Body and chassis
- Class: Ultra-luxury car
- Body style: Coachbuilt to owner's preference: 2-door coupé; 2/4-door convertible; 4-door sedan
- Layout: Front-engine, rear-wheel-drive
- Related: Packard Super Eight

Powertrain
- Engine: 424.1 cu in (6.9 L) V12 (1916-1923); 445.5 cu in (7.3 L) V12 (1933-1934); 473.3 cu in (7.8 L) V12 (1935-1939)

Dimensions
- Wheelbase: 125–135 in (3,175–3,429 mm) (1916-1923); 127 3/8 in (3,235 mm) (1938); 132 1/2 in (3.37 m) (1935-1937); 134 3/8 in (3.41 m) (1938-1939); 135 in (3.43 m) (1934); 139 1/4 in (3.54 m) (1935-1937) 139 3/8 in (3.54 m) (1938-1939); 142 in (3.61 m) (1933-1934); 144 1/4 in (3.66 m) (1935-1937); 147 in (3.73 m) (1933-1934)

Chronology
- Predecessor: Packard Six
- Successor: Packard Custom Super Eight

The Packard Twelve was a range of V12-engined luxury automobiles built by the Packard Motor Car Company in Detroit, Michigan. The car was built from model year 1916 until 1923, then it returned 1933 until 1939. As a sign of changing times, the majority of second generation Packard Twelves received standard bodywork, with custom bodywork gradually losing favor. Many of the custom cars were actually only "semi-customs", with Dietrich assembling Packard-made bodies with special touches.

== History ==
Packard introduced the Twin Six to stay competitive with Marmon, Pierce-Arrow, Rolls-Royce, Renault and other luxury brands. Cadillac and Lincoln began offering large luxury products starting in the late 1910s.

Large displacement engines provided the horsepower and torque their clients wanted and due to the low quality of gasoline fuel at the time, and low compression ratios, 50 bhp was more than adequate. It is estimated that the rating equivalent of early gasoline available varied from 40 to 60 octane and that the "High-Test", sometimes referred to as "fighting grade", probably averaged 50 to 65 octane.

=== First generation ===
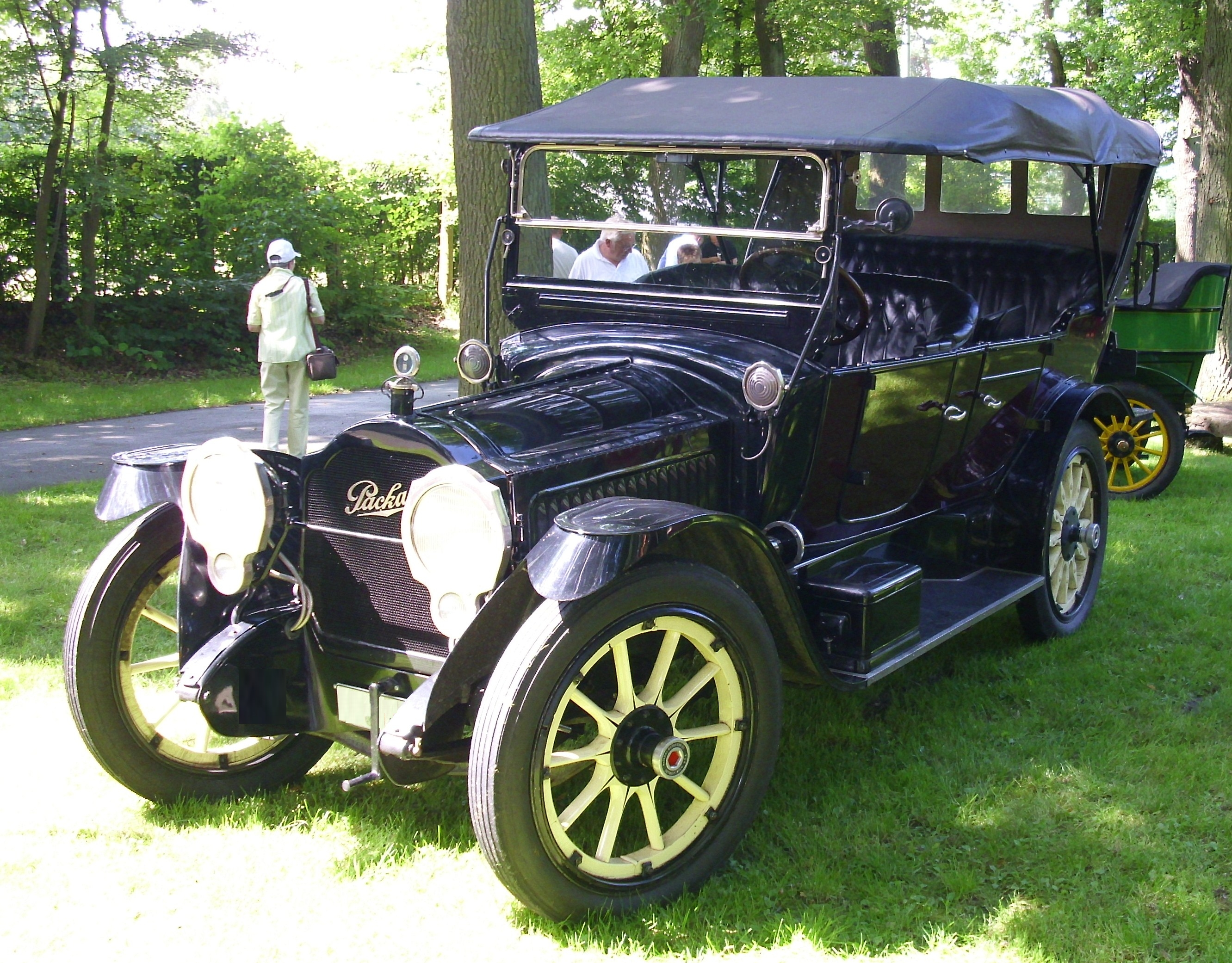
1916 Packard Twin Six Model 1-35 Touring Sedan

The first company produced 12-cylinder engine was in 1916, called the Packard Twin Six (1-25, 1-35) signifying two different wheelbases of 125 in (3,200 mm) and 135 in (3,400 mm), and was for four years the only product sold until the Single Six returned in 1921. The standard paint scheme for open cars, touring sedans, phaetons, and runabouts was Packard blue with cream yellow striping on body and door panels, with black used on the underbody, radiator, fenders, chassis and running gear with no striping. Wheels were painted cream yellow with black stripes. Closed body choices were painted similar without cream yellow painted wheels. Brightwork was nickel plated, and a Warner speedometer, with a Waltham clock, among other items, were standard equipment. Optionally, the choice of interior and exterior colors were endless to accommodate the customers preferences.

Ten different body styles were available on either wheelbase while coupe and runabout body styles were only offered on the 125" wheelbase. The engine was a 60 degree L-head displacing 424.1 cu in (6,950 cc) producing 88 hp (66 kW) at 2600 rpm. Detachable heads and larger radiators came in 1916, a center-mounted gear shifter and brake levers in 1917.

The range consisted of three series, built from May 1915 until June 1923. It was available with a shorter wheelbase from 1915 until May 1919. From 1915 to 1920, the Twin Six was the sole offering from Packard. Production was 30,941 automobiles. Prices started at US$3,050 ($90,241 in 2025 dollars) to US$5,150 ($152,374 in 2025 dollars) for the Imperial Limousine. The 1919 Third Series Twin Six 3-25 Runabout was used as the pace car for the 1919 Indianapolis 500 auto race.

- First series (May, 1915 until August, 1916)

Packard Twin Six 1-25; wheelbase 125 in. Engine without detachable cylinder head
Packard Twin Six 1-35; wheelbase 135 in. Engine without detachable cylinder head

- Second series (August, 1916 until August, 1917)

Packard Twin Six 2-25; wheelbase 126½ in. Engine with detachable cylinder head
Packard Twin Six 2-35; wheelbase 136 in. Engine with detachable cylinder head

- Third series (August, 1917 until June, 1923. 3-25 ends May, 1919)

Packard Twin Six 3-25; wheelbase 126½ in. tapered hood, straight body, center shift and brake levers
Packard Twin Six 3-35; wheelbase 136 in. tapered hood, straight body, center shift and brake levers

=== Second generation ===
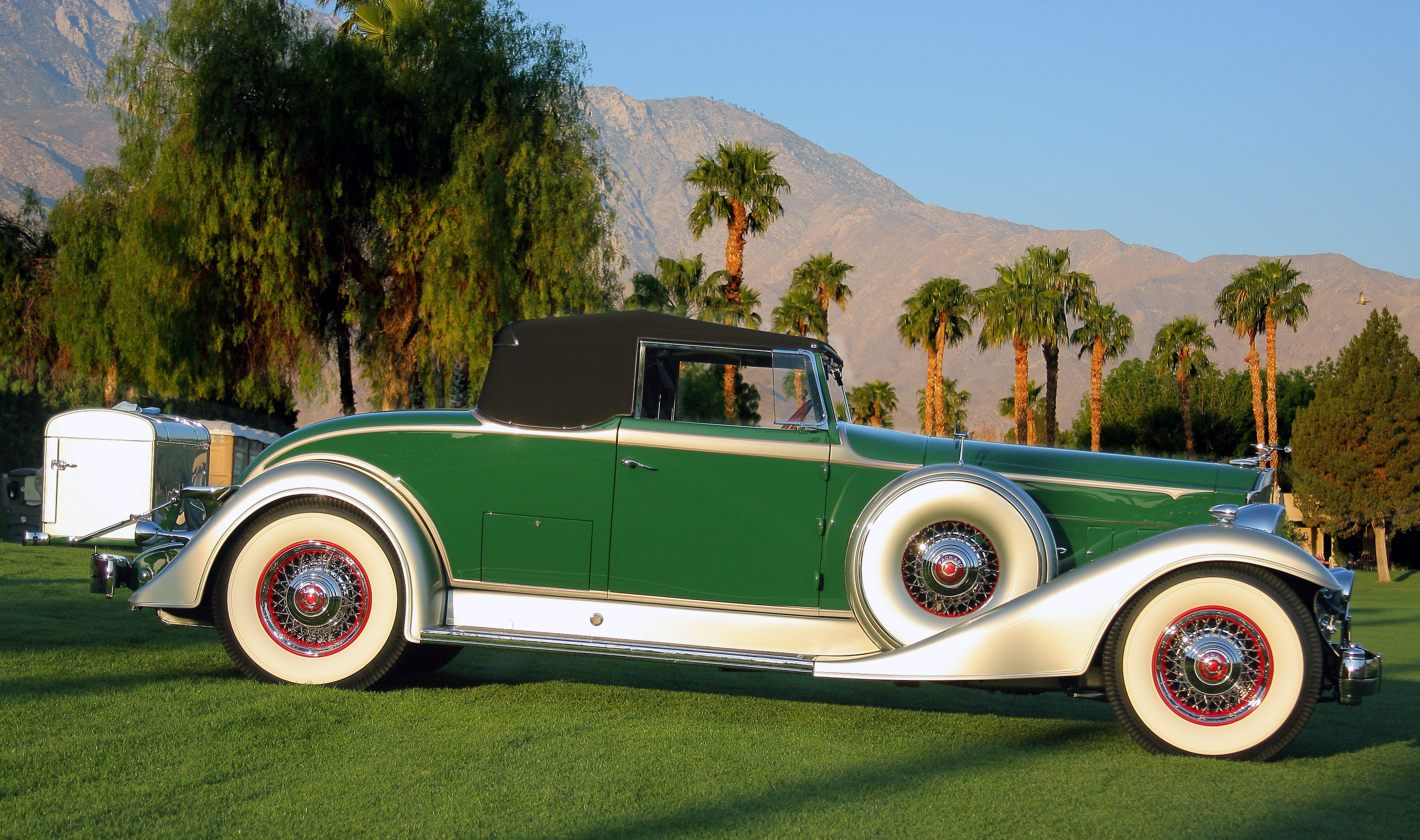
1933 Packard Tenth Series Twelve (1005) Convertible Coupé

For 1933 Packard reintroduced a twelve-cylinder engine, initially called the "Twin Six", then changing the name to "Packard Twelve," to align it with the rest of the Packard lineup. This was the 10th Series and two models were on offer: the 1005 and the 1006 had wheelbases of 142 in (3,606.80 mm) and 147 in (3,733.80 mm). The Twin Six' double drop frame was replaced by a tapered design. Convertibles and roadsters used leftover ninth series bodies with a smaller radiator than the all-new tenth series models.

The Twin Six' V12-engine was retained without major change. The cylinder blocks are at a 67-degree angle, bore and stroke 3 7/16 and 4 in (87.3 and 101.6 mm) respectively. A 445.5 cu in (7,300 cc) displacement was the result and maximum power is 160 hp (119 kW) at 3200 rpm. The cooling system was improved and a new Bendix-Stromberg EE-3 carburetor with an automatic choke was introduced, increasing power somewhat. A single dry-plate clutch replaced the earlier twin-plate model, matched to a floor-shifted three-speed manual transmission and a new one-piece driveshaft. The existing mechanical brakes were also adopted for the Twelve.

The shorter wheelbase (Model 1005) was available with at least ten different styles of bodywork, ranging from the two-seat Coupe Roadster to the five-seat Formal Sedan. Standard bodyworks for the long wheelbase Model 1006 were Sedan and Sedan Limousine (both either five- or seven-seaters), with a host of custom bodyworks also on offer. These were mainly by Dietrich and LeBaron. The Super Eight long wheelbase chassis was no longer available, restricting custom bodyworks to the new Twelve.

It competed with the introduced other ultra luxury cars as Hispano-Suiza J12, Cadillac V-16, Isotta Fraschini Tipo 8B, Duesenberg J, Lincoln K, Rolls-Royce Phantom II, Bentley 8 Litre, Mercedes-Benz 770 and Pierce-Arrow Model 53

=== Year-to-year changes ===
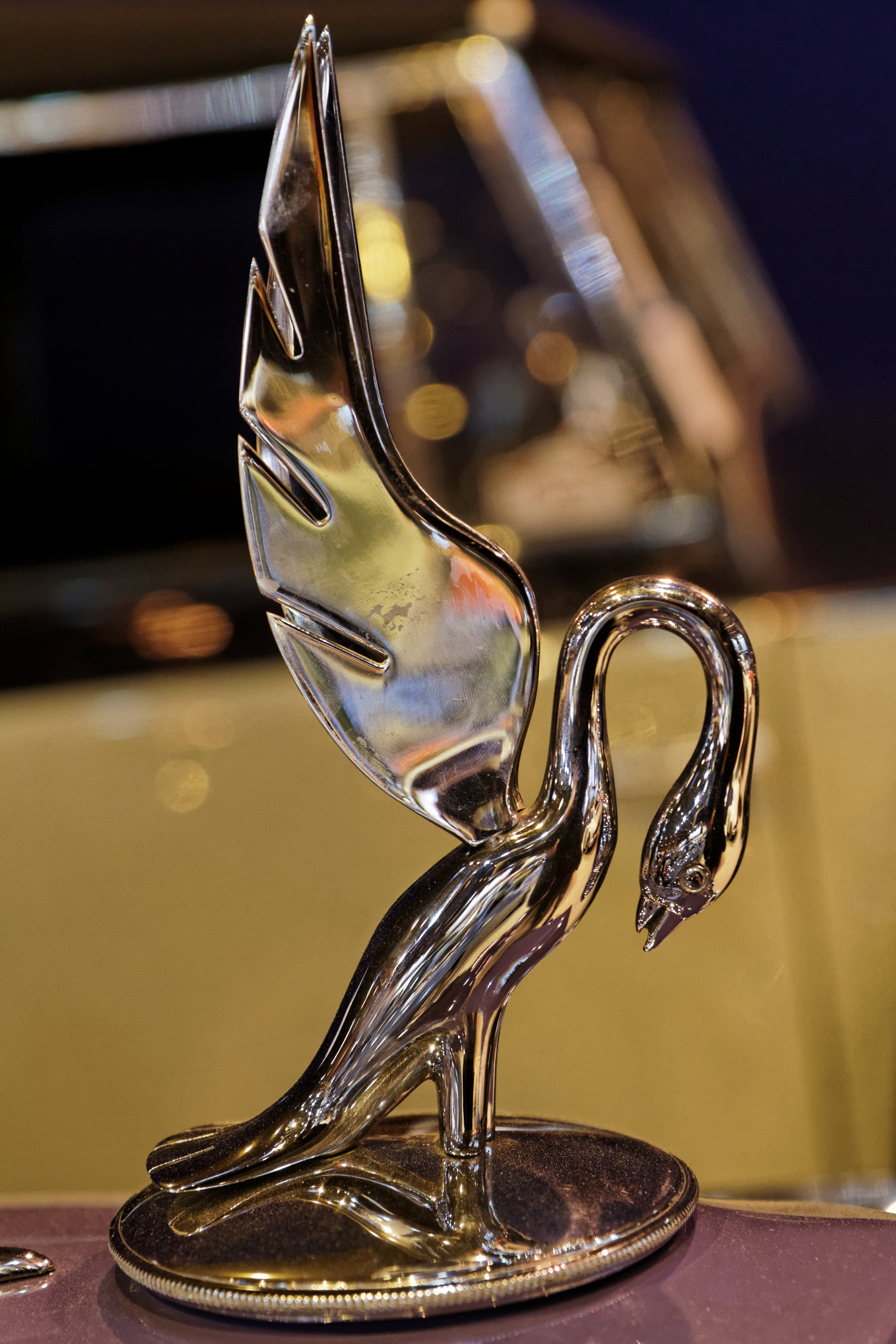
Packard "Cormorant" hood ornament

In 1934 the 11th series model was introduced, adding a shorter third version on the 135 in (3.43 m) chassis of the Super Eight. An "Aero Sport Coupe" bodied in-house and a LeBaron-bodied "Runabout Speedster" were available on this wheelbase; only around ten of these two types were made. The appearance of the dramatic, almond-shaped Aero Sport Coupe was guided by Packard stylist Ed Macauley although the actual design work was done by Count Alexis de Sakhnoffsky in his stint as a consultant at Packard. Only four Sport Coupes were built. This was the last car to be "Custom Made by Packard." The Model codes were 1106 (short), 1107 (middle), and 1108 (long). 960 Packard Twelves were built in 1934. This was also the first year that a radio was a factory option.

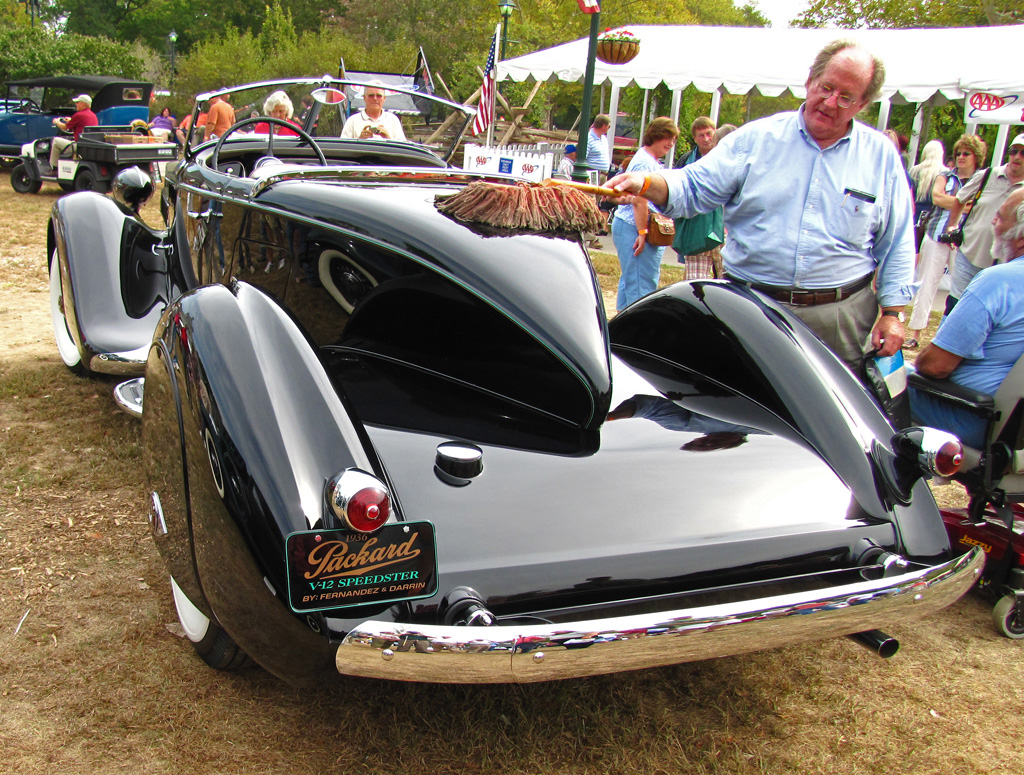
1936 Packard Fourteenth Series Twelve Boattail Speedster

For the 12th Series of 1935, the engine gained aluminum heads and was stroked by a quarter inch, bringing up the displacement to 473.3 cu in (7,756 cc). Power was 175 hp (130 kW) at 3200 rpm and a high compression version with 180 hp (134 kW) was also available. The gearbox was now fully synchronized and both the mechanical brakes and the clutch received vacuum assist. The new wheelbases on offer were 132 1/2 in (3.37 m), 139 1/4 in (3.54 m), and 144 1/4 in (3.66 m). The 14th Series of 1936 was largely unchanged from the 12th (there was no 13th Series). The only differences were a radiator angled by five more degrees, the oil temperature regulator was redesigned, and the shortest wheelbase model was discontinued.

Model year 1937 brought hydraulic brakes for the 15th Series Twelve; these had already been available for two years on the Packard One Twenty. Suicide doors were changed to conventional, front-hinged ones. With 1300 built, 1937 was the Twelve's most successful year, and Dietrich offered six custom coachwork options.

1938's 16th Series brought yet shorter wheelbases: 127 3/8 in (3.24 m), 134 3/8 in (3.41 m), and 139 3/8 in (3.54 m). The shortest Model 1606 used the Super Eight chassis but was not included in Packard's brochures and it is unsure if any were built. Only 566 16th Series Twelves were built, followed by 446 17th Series. The fenders were of a heavier design than on previous years' models, while a column shift became and option alongside the center mounted shifter. This shape remained in use for 1939's 17th Series, the last of the Packard Twelves. 5262 examples were built in total, with the top sedan as the All Weather Cabriolet by Brunn & Company for US$8,510 ($194,644 in 2025 dollars). For 1940 Packard's top model was the Packard Custom Super Eight.

In October 1935, American President Franklin D. Roosevelt gave Joseph Stalin an armoured Packard Twelve, which became the dictator's favourite automotive vehicle for many years.

== Gallery ==
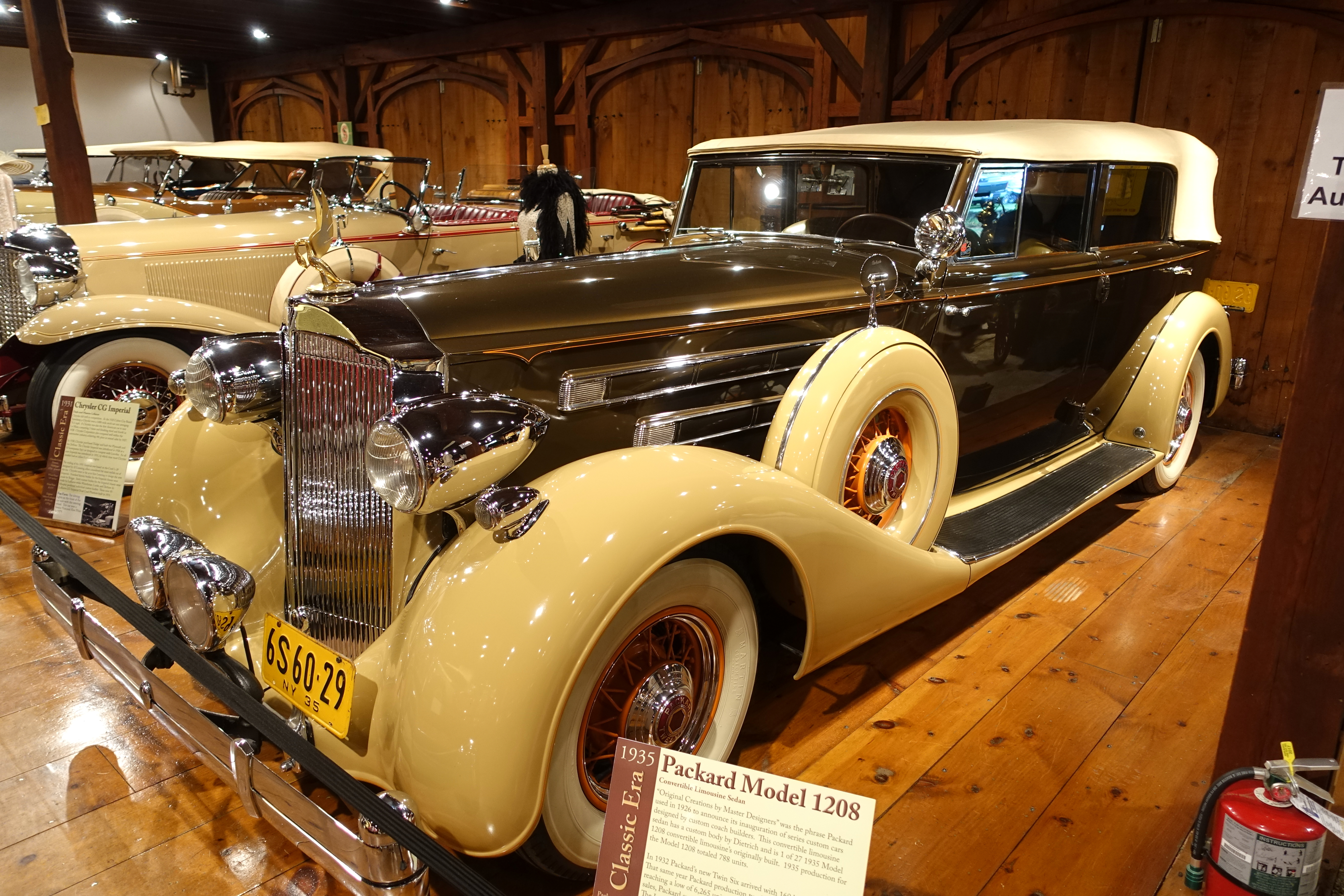
1935 Packard Twelve 1208, Convertible Sedan, by Dietrich

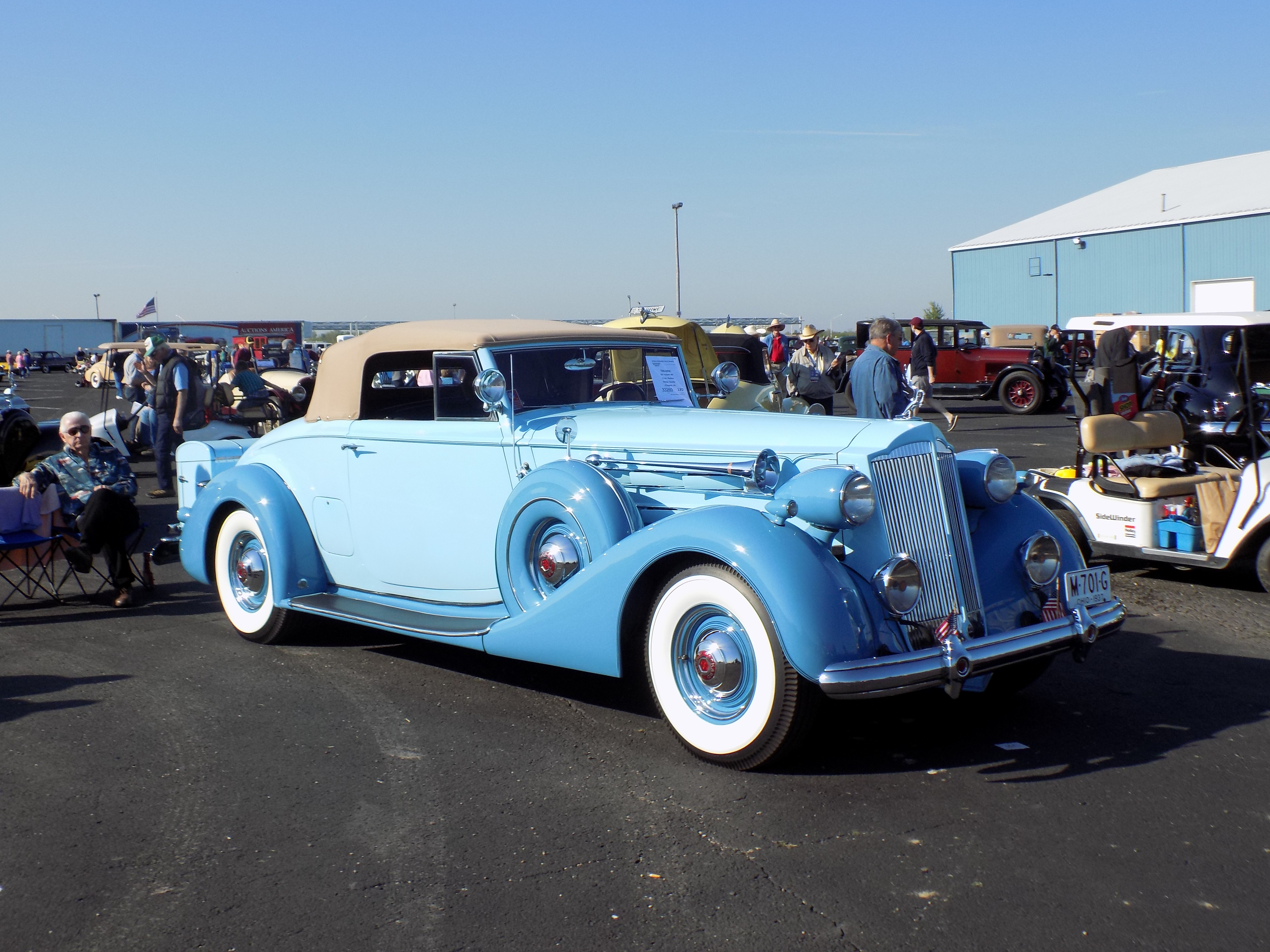
1937 Packard Twelve 1507, Coupe roadster

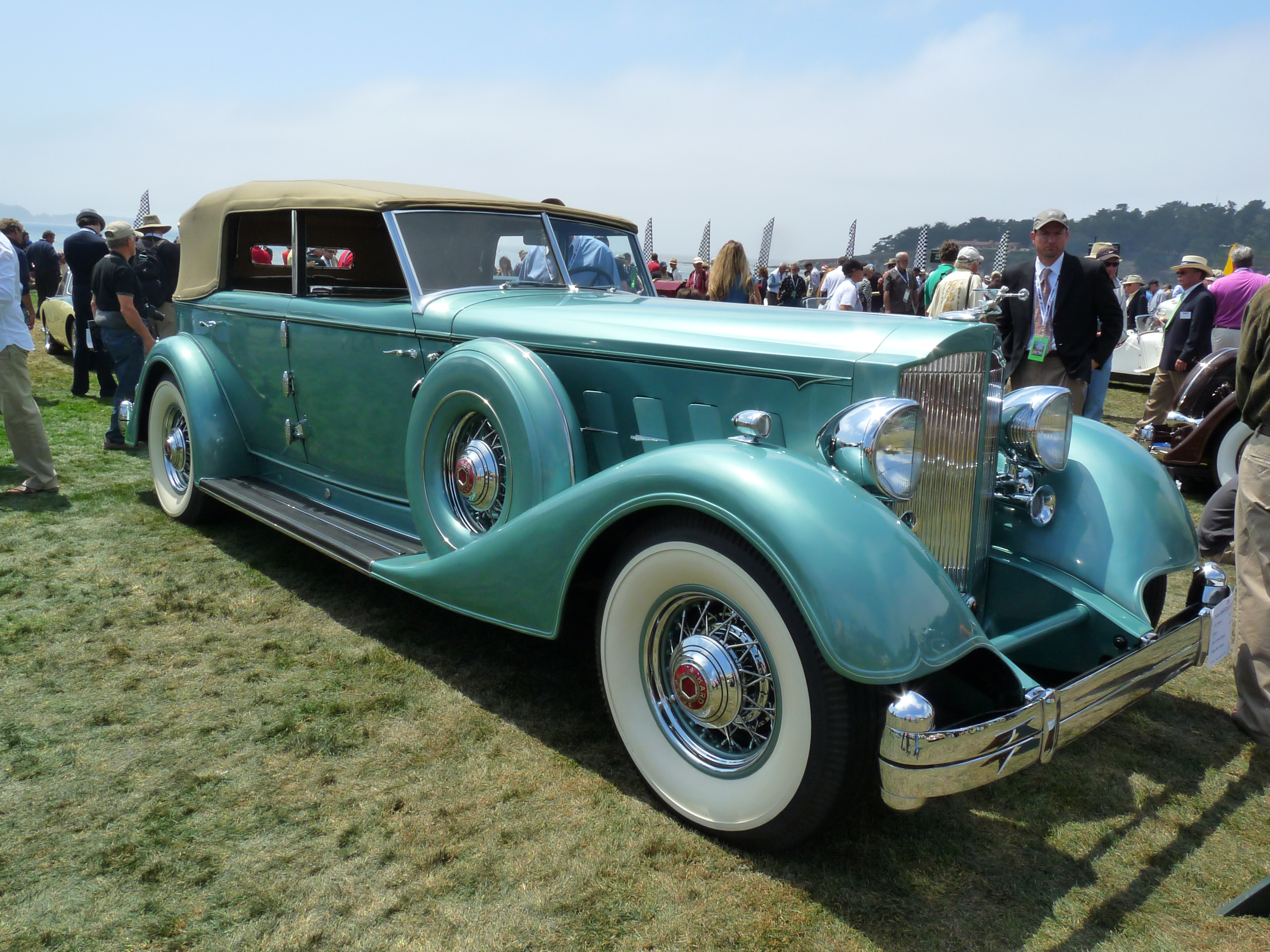
1934 Packard Twelve 1108 Dietrich Convertible Sedan

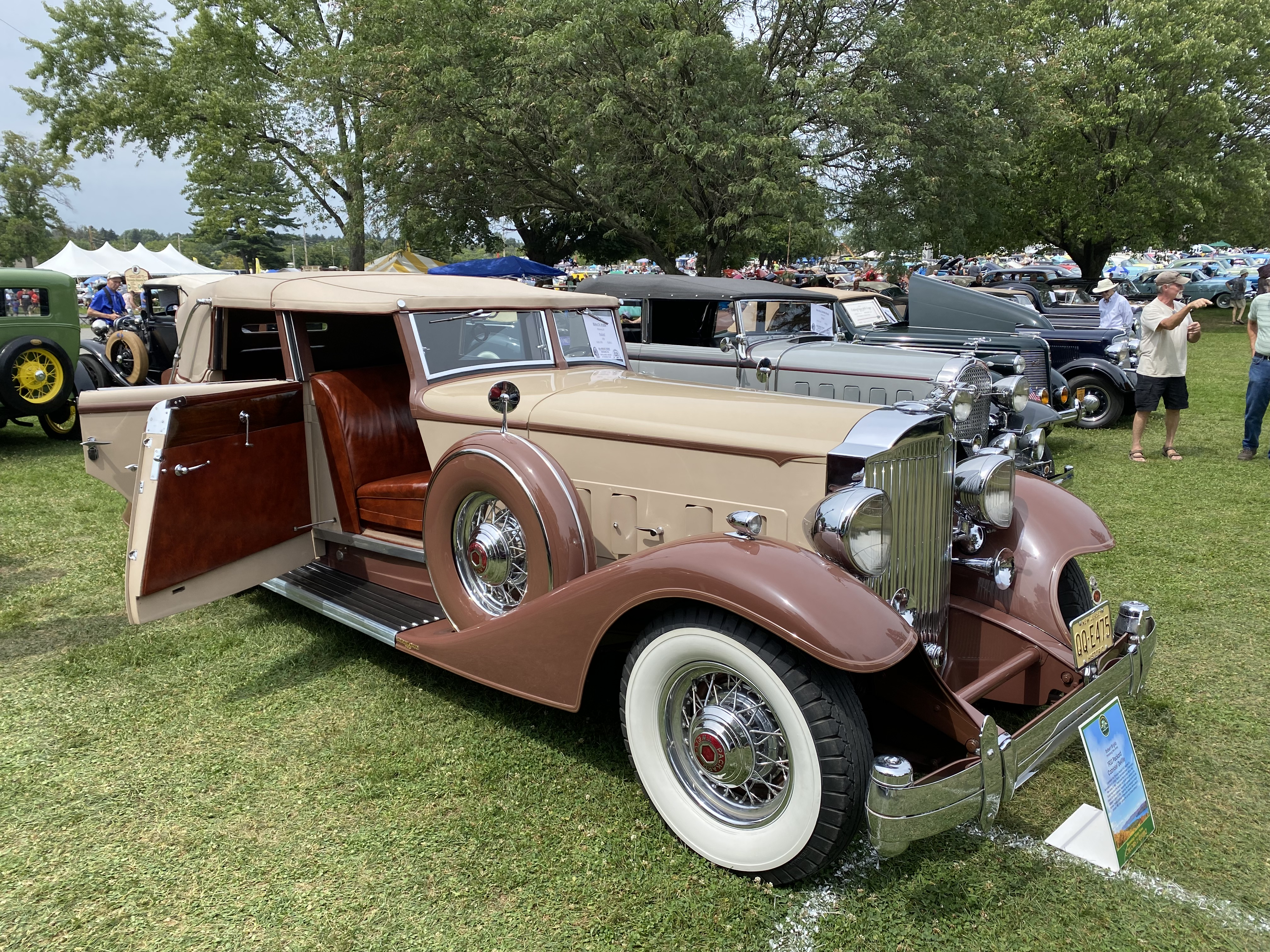
1933 Packard Twelve, Cabriolet DeVille

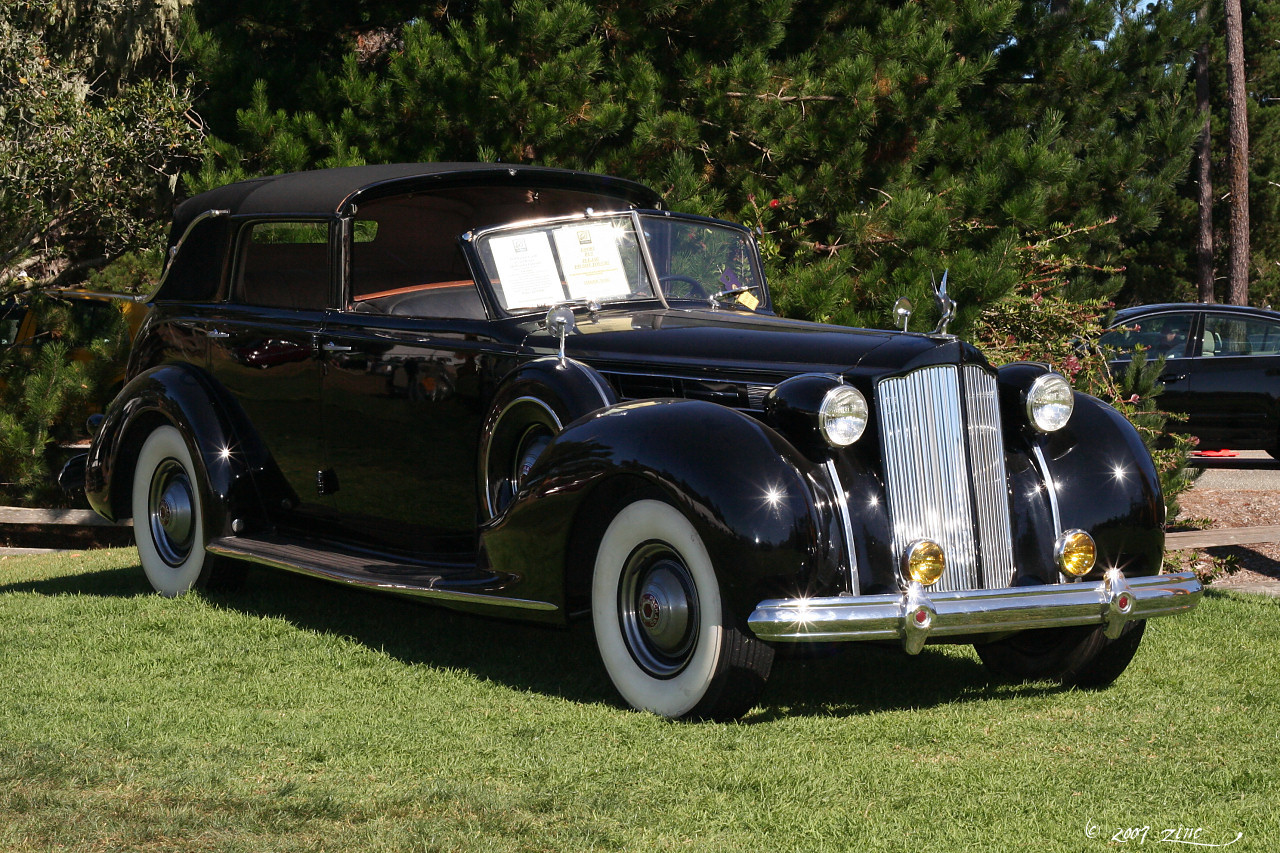
1938 Packard 1608 V12 Brunn All-Weather Cabriolet town car

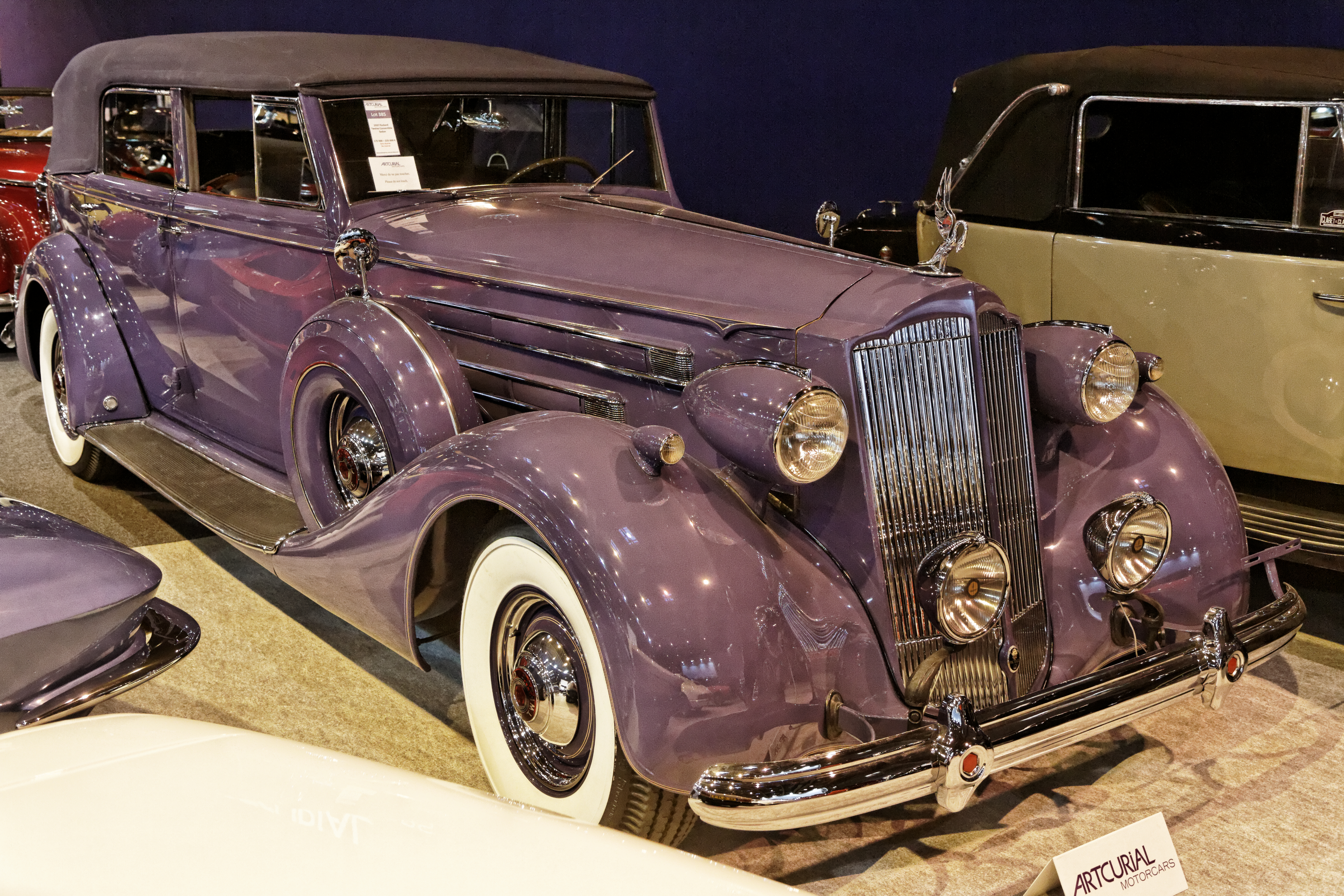
Packard Twelve Convertible Sedan

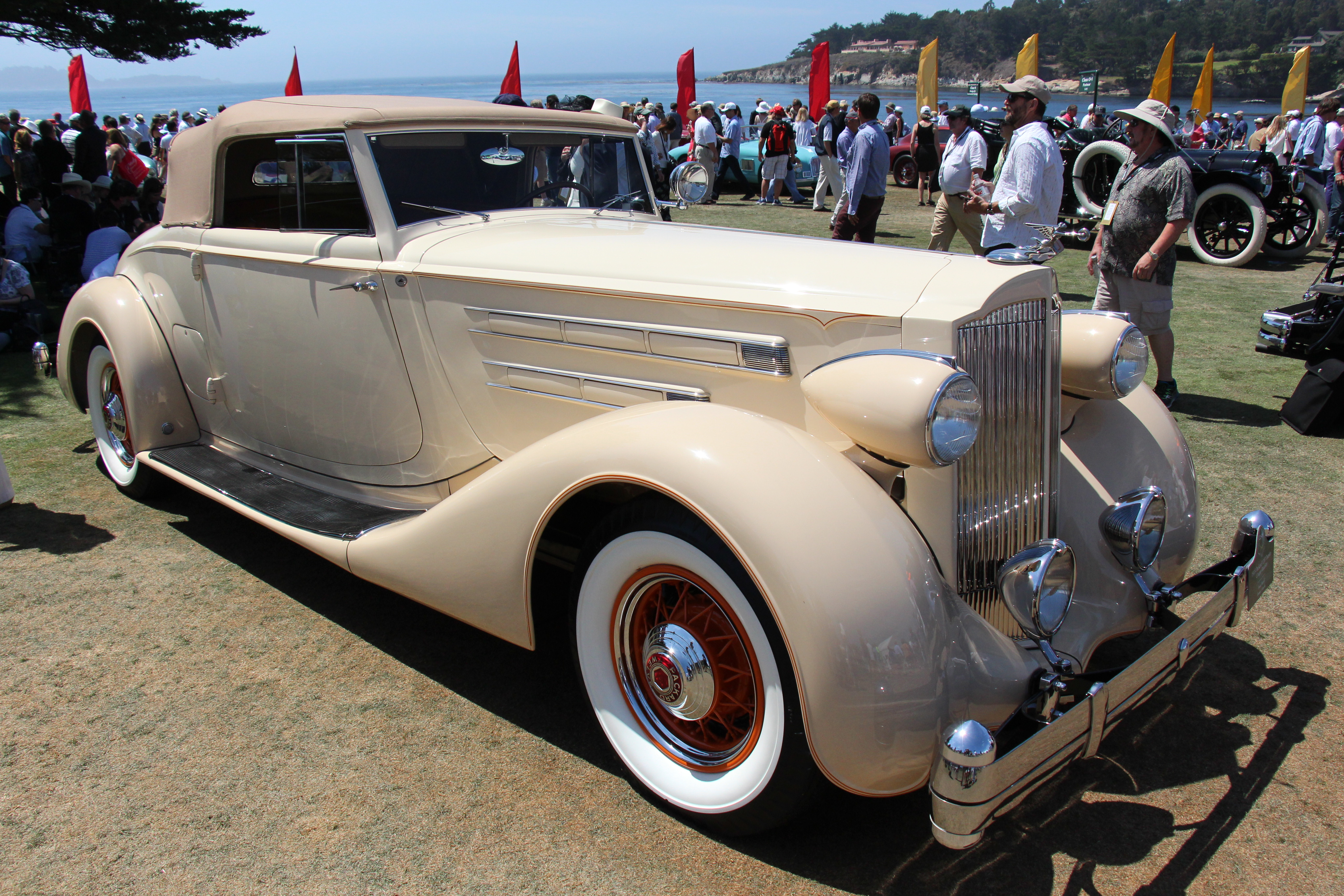
1935 Packard Twelve Model 1207 Coupe Roadster
