= Mini MPV =

Subcompact minivan

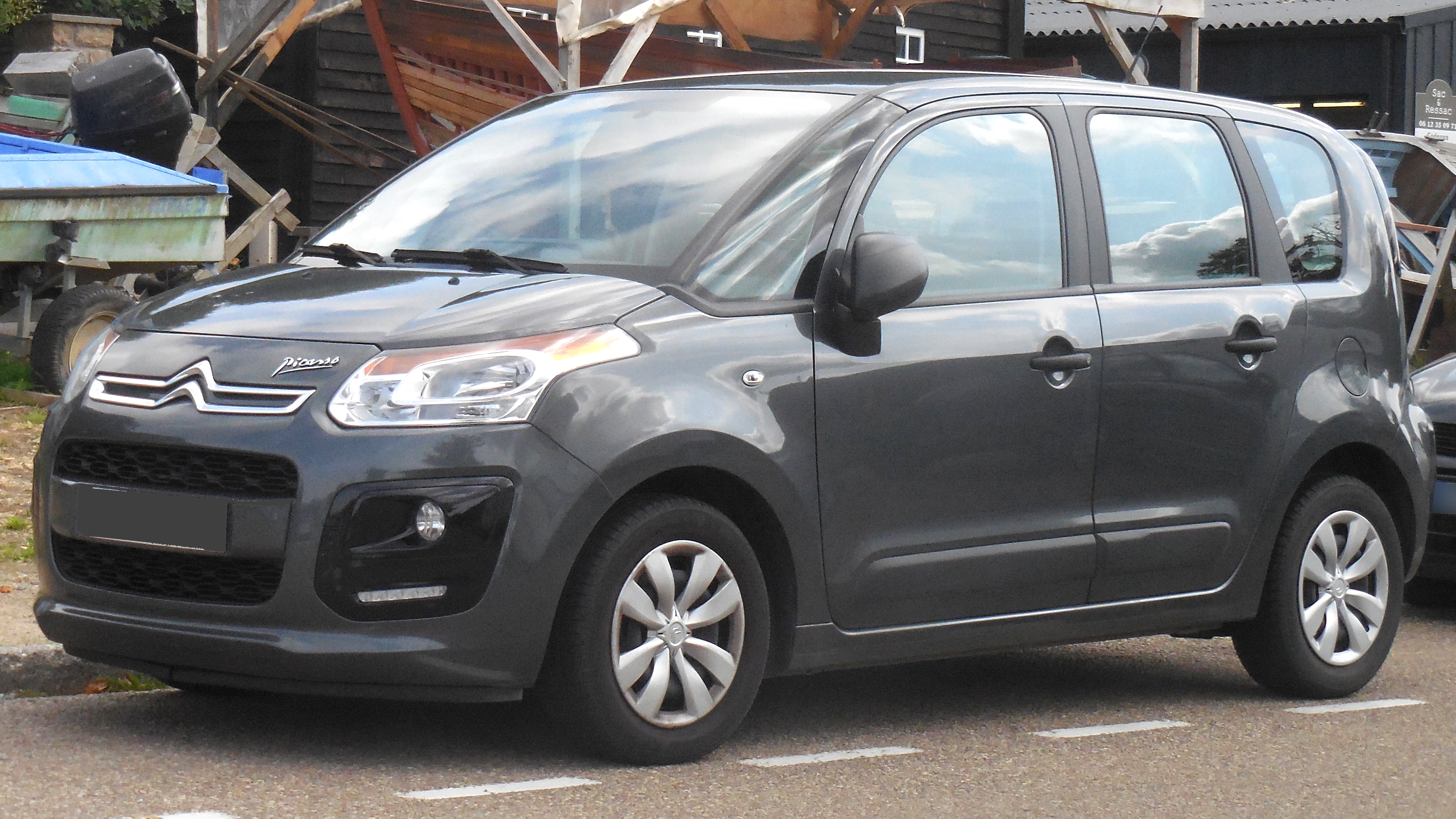
Citroën C3 Picasso, an example of a two-row mini MPV for the European market

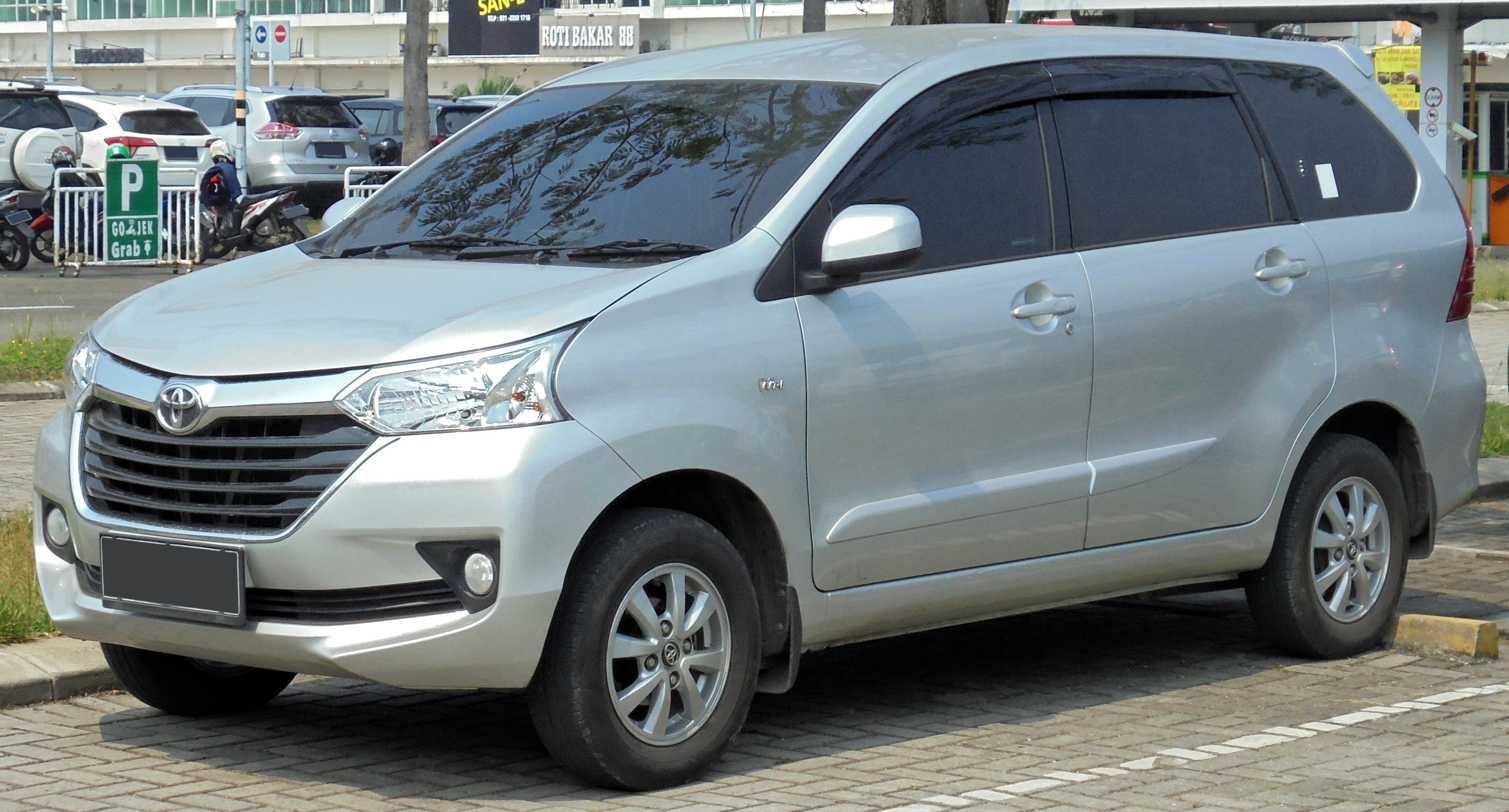
Toyota Avanza, an example of a three-row mini MPV for the Asian market

Mini MPV (an abbreviation for mini multipurpose vehicle) is a vehicle size class for the smallest size of minivans/multipurpose vehicles (MPVs). The mini MPV size class sits below the compact MPV size class, and the vehicles are often built on the platforms of B-segment hatchback models. By the European definition, the mini MPV commonly consists of vans with two rows of seats, while in Asia, mini MPVs with three rows are common. Sliding doors are sometimes also fitted to mini MPVs, which are also called tall-hatchbacks or small MPVs.

== Characteristics ==
=== Europe ===
Mini MPVs are typically based on the platform of a B-segment (supermini/subcompact) hatchback, with a raised roof and five-door body. The raised roof allows for higher H-point seating and easy passenger access compared with traditional hatchbacks. Often, the rear seats can recline, slide, tumble, fold flat, or be removed easily, allowing users to reconfigure the rear passenger and cargo volumes for each journey.

The segment was created as a result of the diversification of minivans in the late 1990s. An early usage of the term "mini MPV" was in 2000, although the vehicles referred to at the time would now be classified as compact MPVs.

Writing for The Daily Telegraph in 2004, noted automotive journalist James May wrote that mini MPV's "are invariably based on an existing hatchback, but offer more headroom, extra 'oddments storage'... and perhaps a touch of sliding seat tomfoolery in the back.... what we are seeing with the mini-MPV is the reinvention of the hatchback, nothing more. It's a good idea, and long overdue, but that's all it is."

In the late 2010s, the mini MPV segment has shrunk with many consumers opting to buy B-segment (subcompact) crossover SUVs that offer similar practicality with better design and capability. Many manufacturers chose to discontinue its models in favour of subcompact crossover SUVs, having 13 models in 2013 competing in the segment with total sales volume of 450,897 units, and just six years later having only four models in 2019 with 93,720 sold.

In terms of practicality and its basic form, this category often overlaps with the similar B-segment (subcompact) crossover SUV. Several manufacturers have introduced a crossover SUV to replace mini MPVs in Europe due to dwindling sales; the examples are the Citroën C3 Aircross, which replaced the Citroën C3 Picasso, and the Opel Crossland X replacing the Opel Meriva. Both offered more headroom and legroom space compared to normal B-segment/subcompact hatchbacks. B-segment SUVs usually ride higher, feature a higher and longer bonnet, equipped with black plastic overfenders or body kits, and marketed as such.

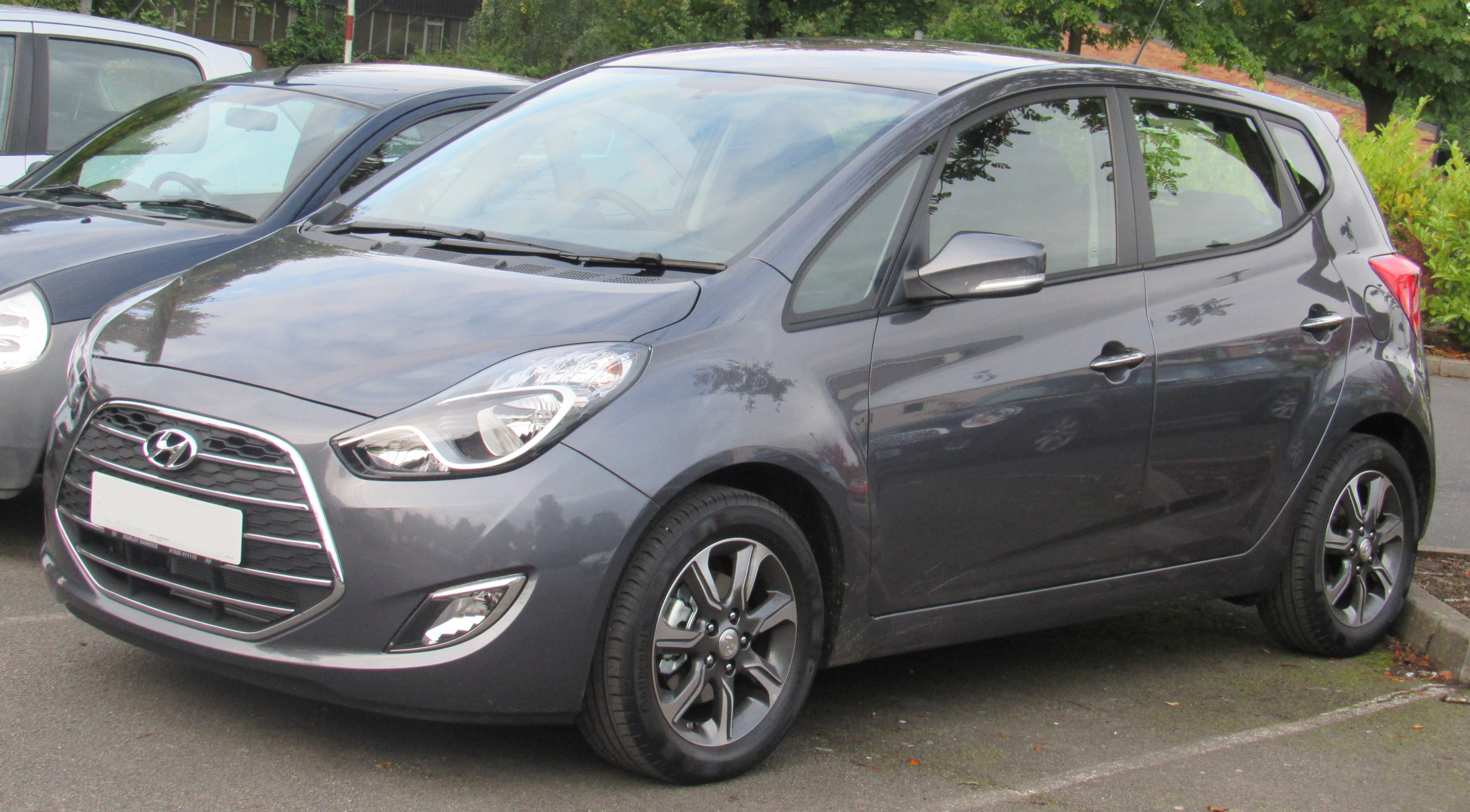
Hyundai ix20 (2010–2020)

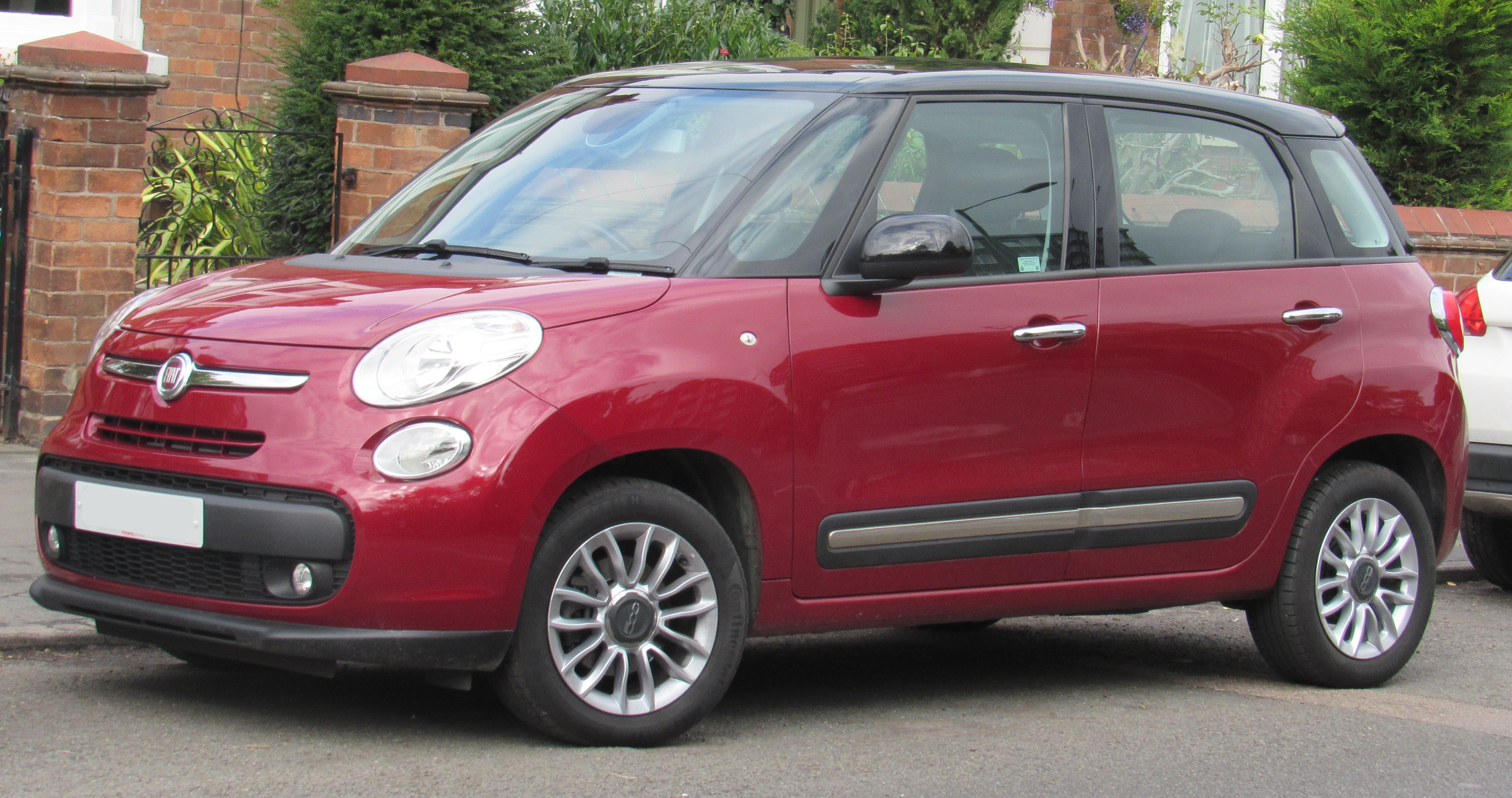
Fiat 500L (2012–2022)

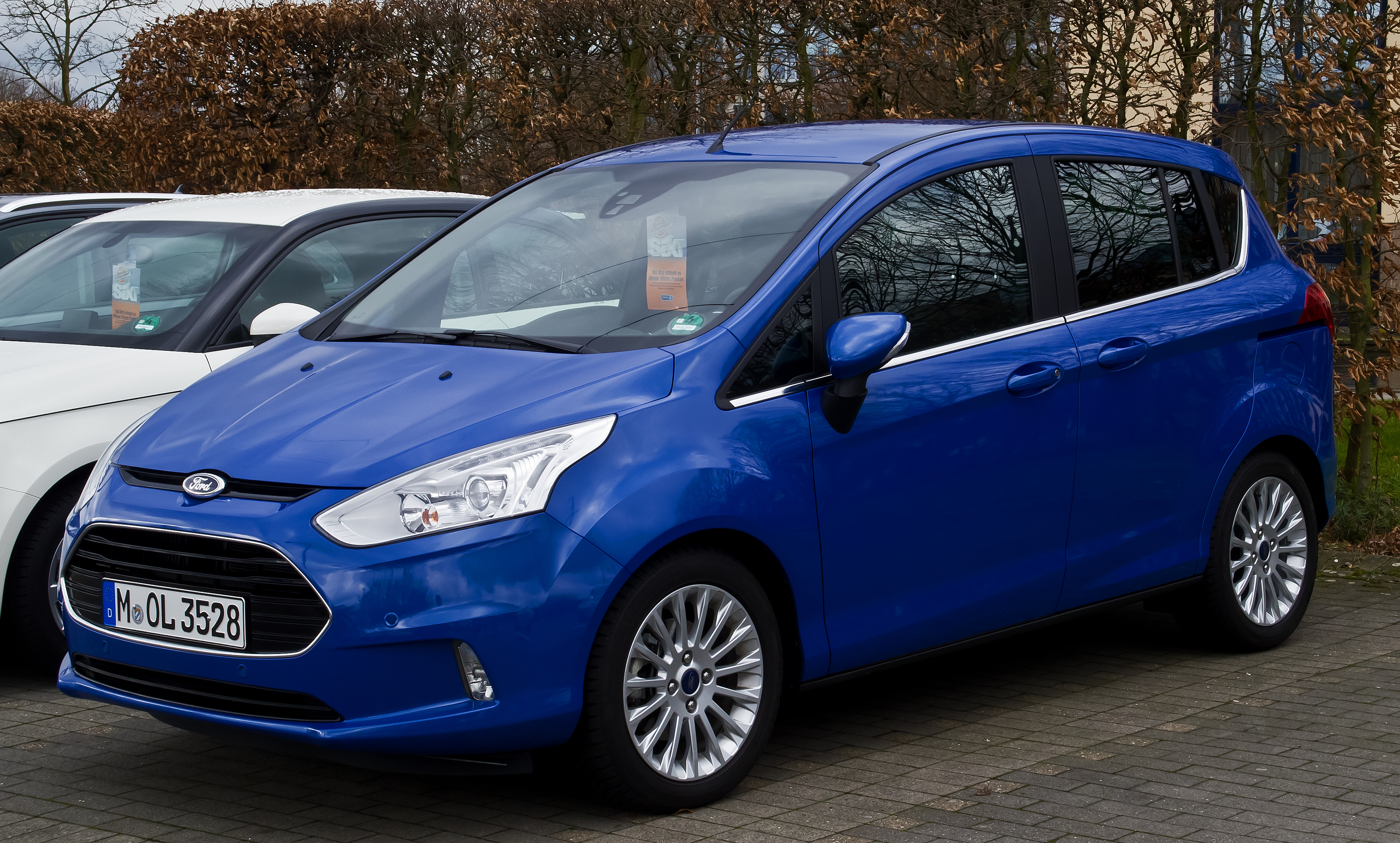
Ford B-Max (2012–2017)

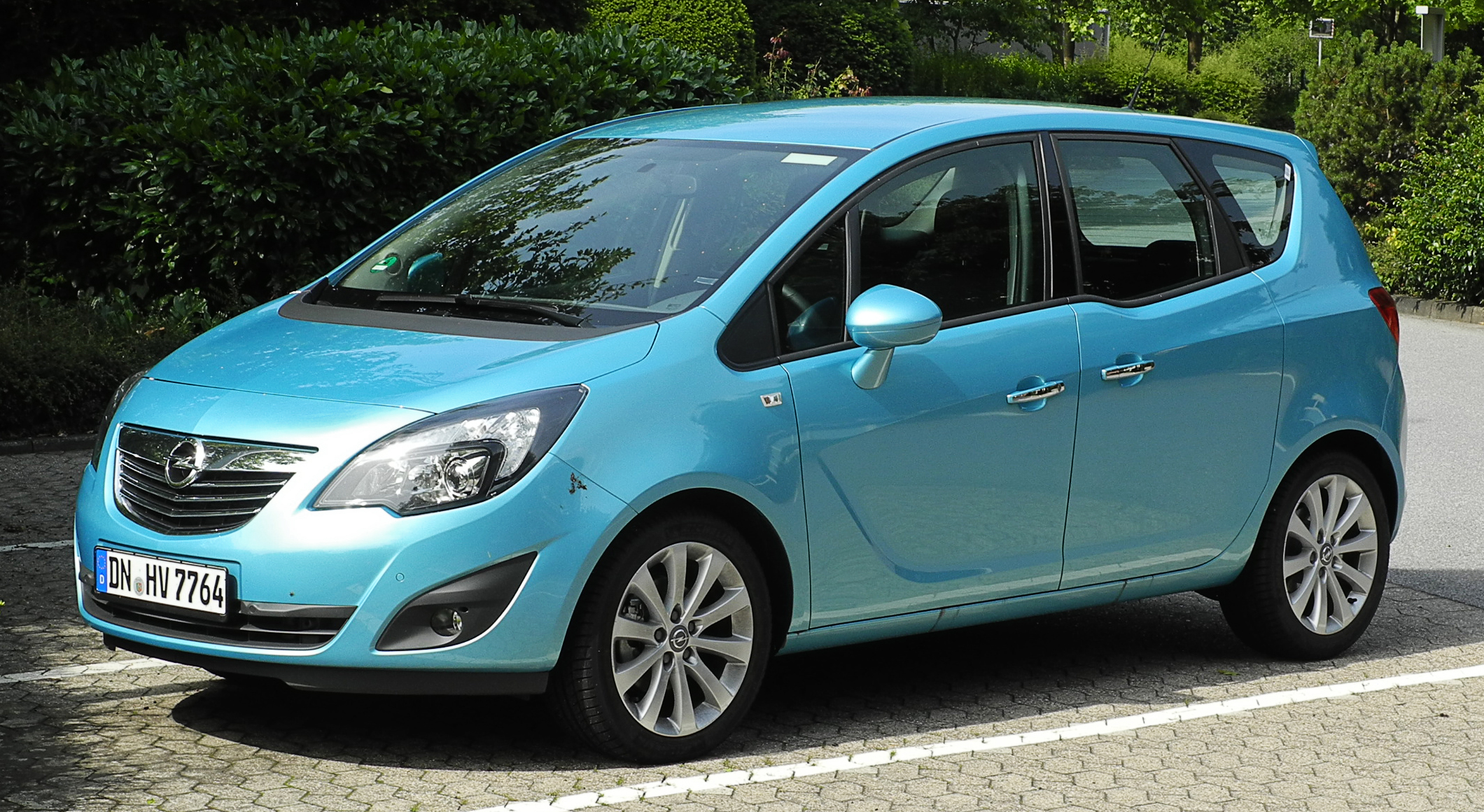
Opel Meriva (2003–2017)

=== Asia ===
Mini MPVs (also called small MPVs, sometimes also mixed or used interchangeably with compact MPV class) apart from the cars matching the European definition could also include B-segment MPVs with three rows of seats with the length shorter than 4.2–4.3 metres (165.4–169.3 in). They are also sometimes equipped with rear sliding doors. This category is common in Japan, Southeast Asia and India, where cars with a smaller footprint and large cabin space are preferred.

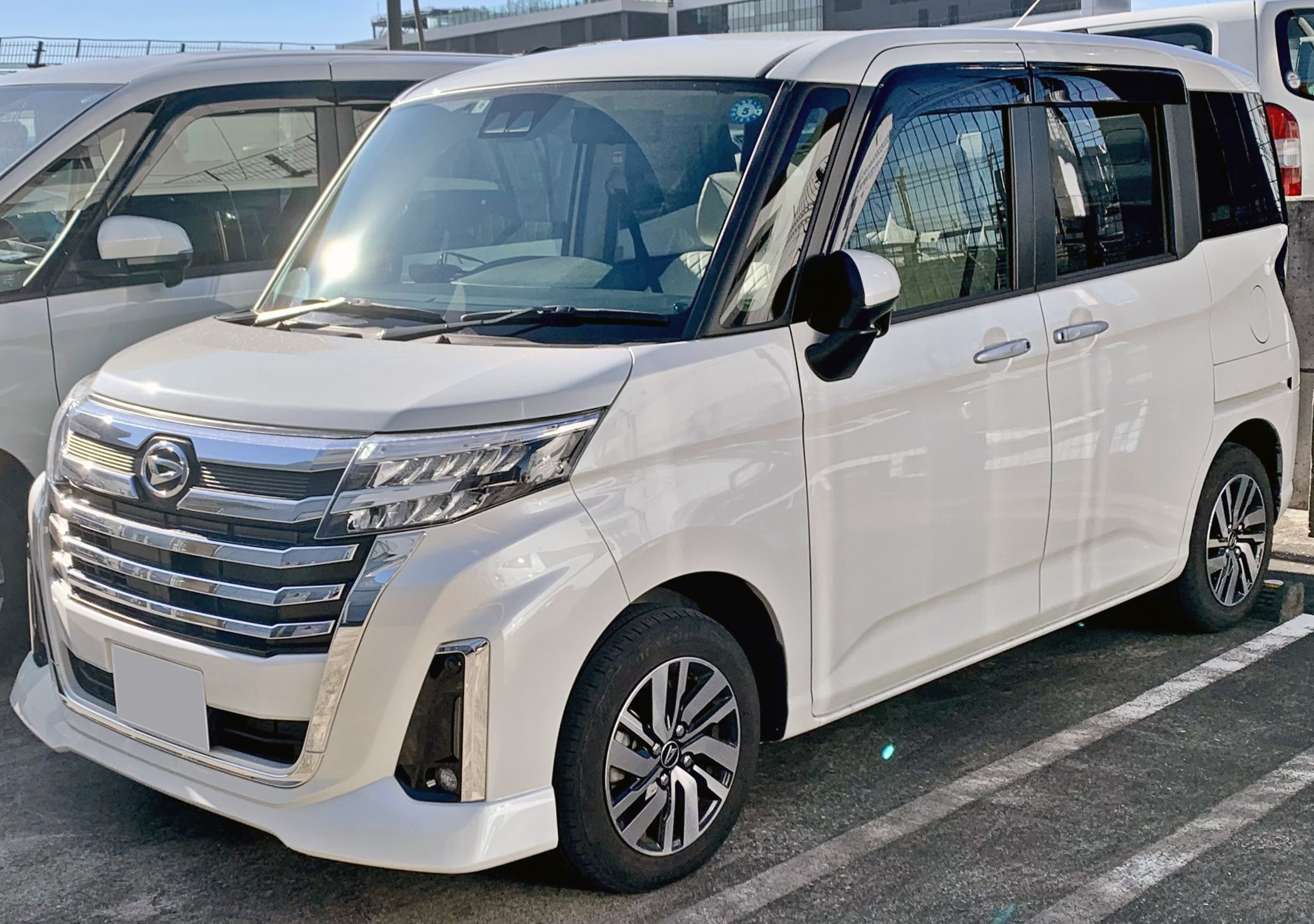
Daihatsu Thor (2016–present)

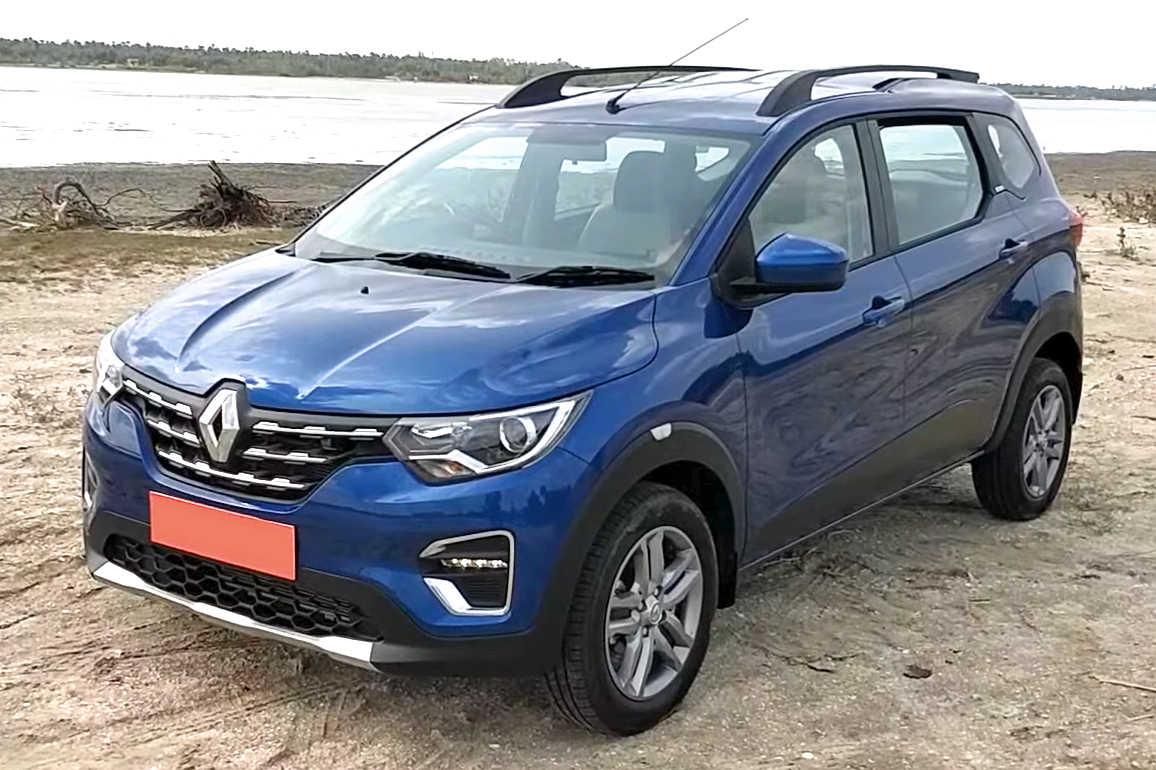
Renault Triber (2019–present)

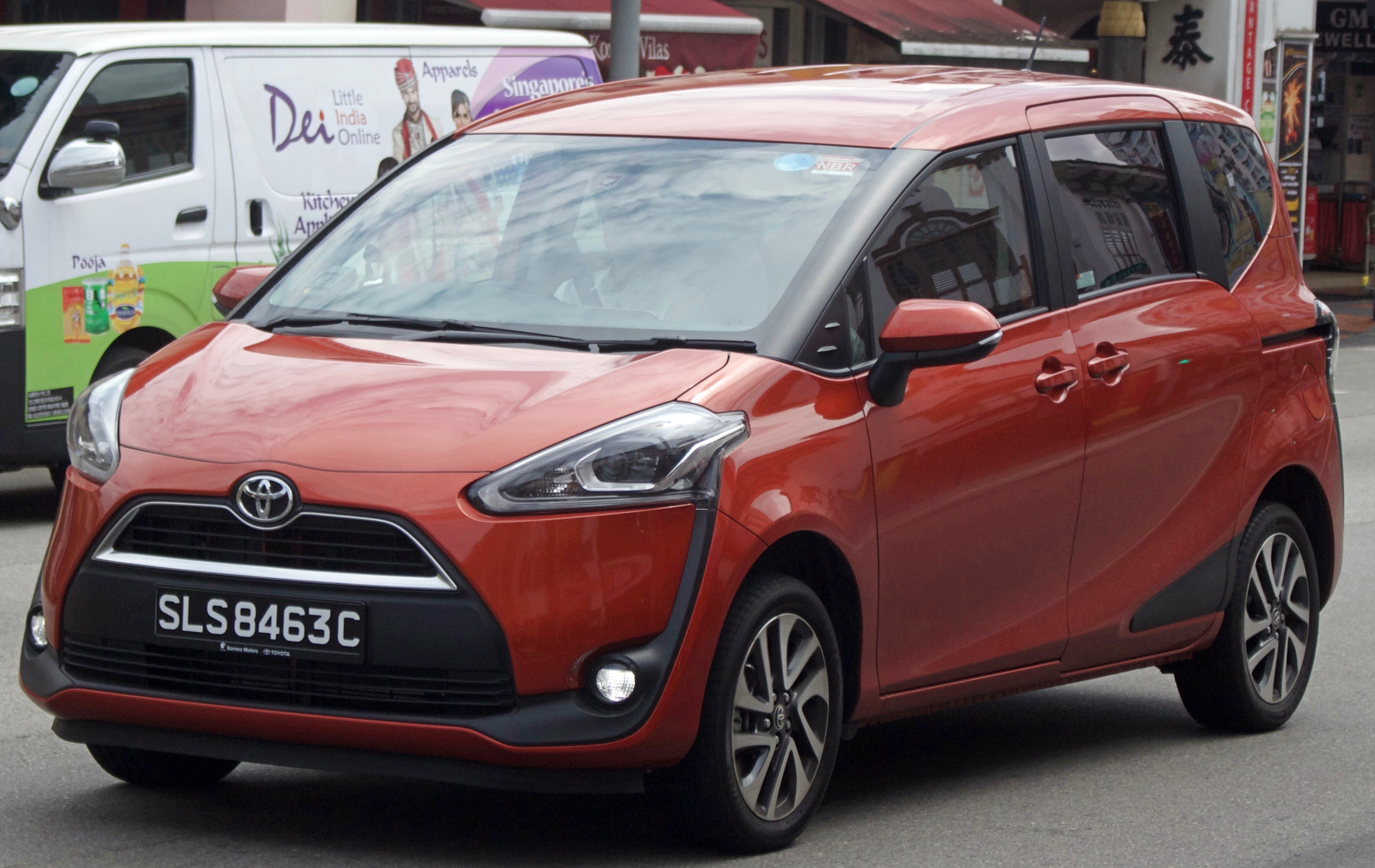
Toyota Sienta (2003–present)

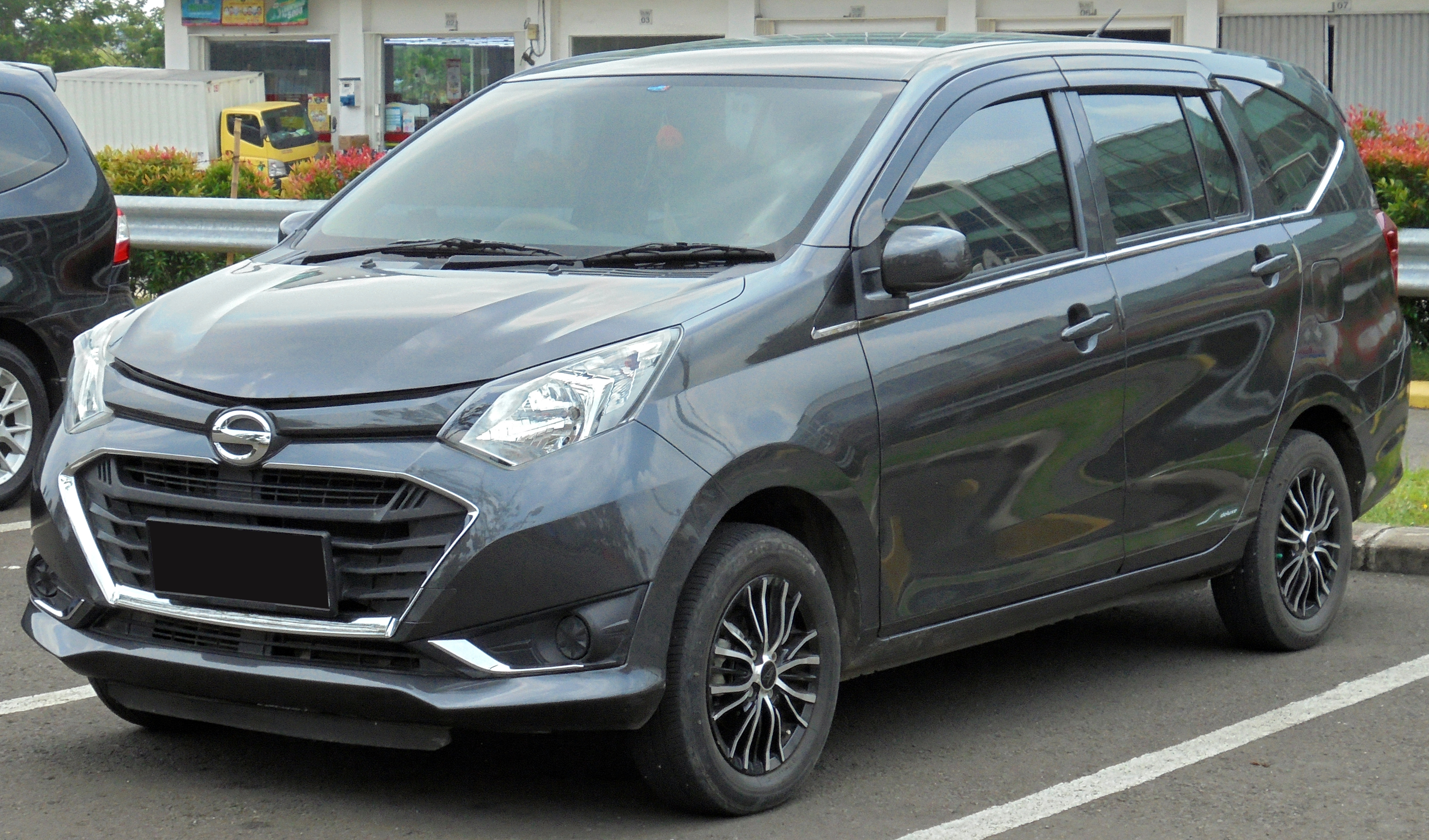
Daihatsu Sigra (2016–present)

=== North America ===
Although mini MPV presence in this region is small, several cars that match the description of a European mini MPV are marketed in the region as another category, as the 'mini MPV' phrase is not commonly used by journalists, manufacturers and regulators. An example is the Kia Soul, which is prominently marketed as a subcompact crossover SUV or a subcompact hatchback.

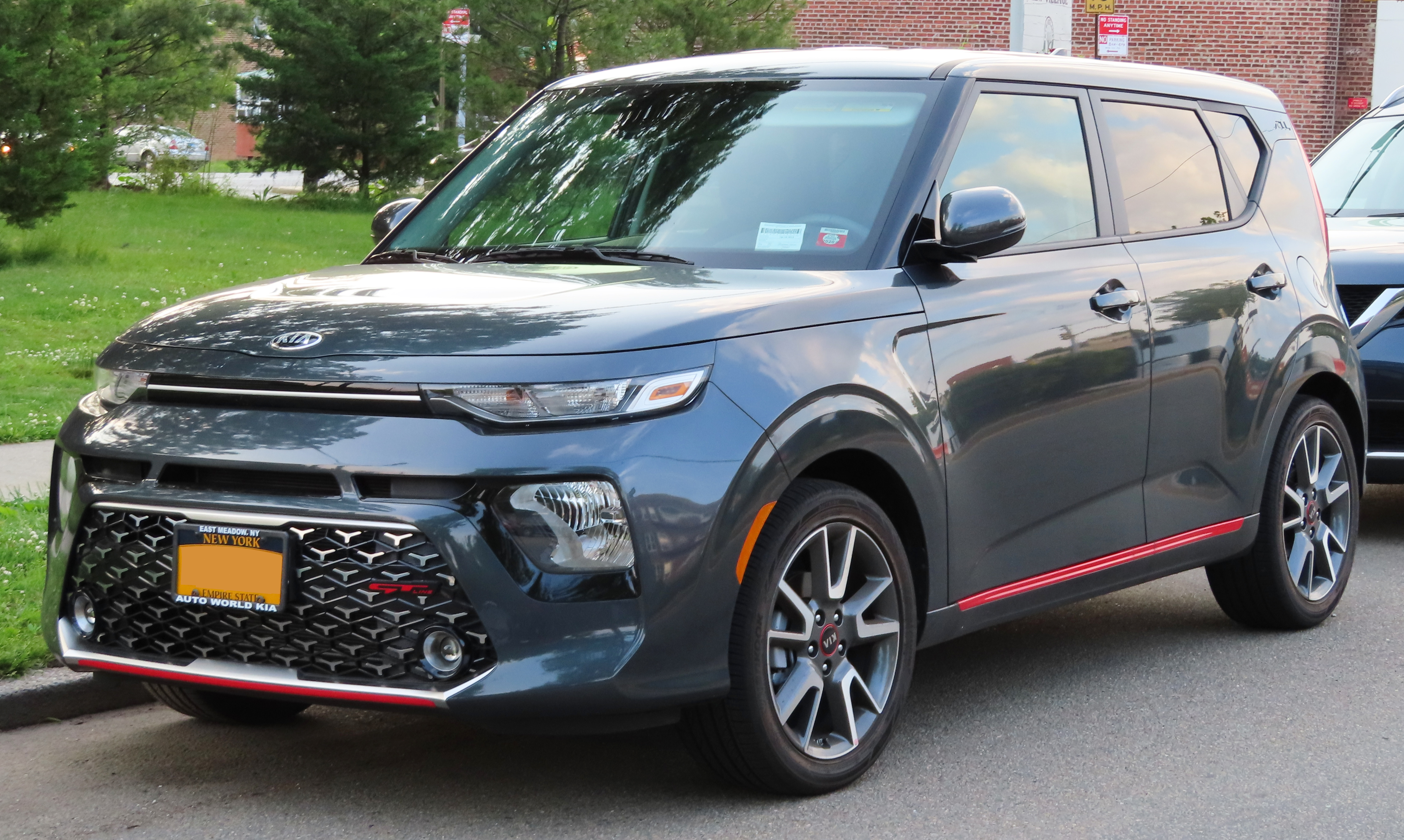
Kia Soul (2008–2025)

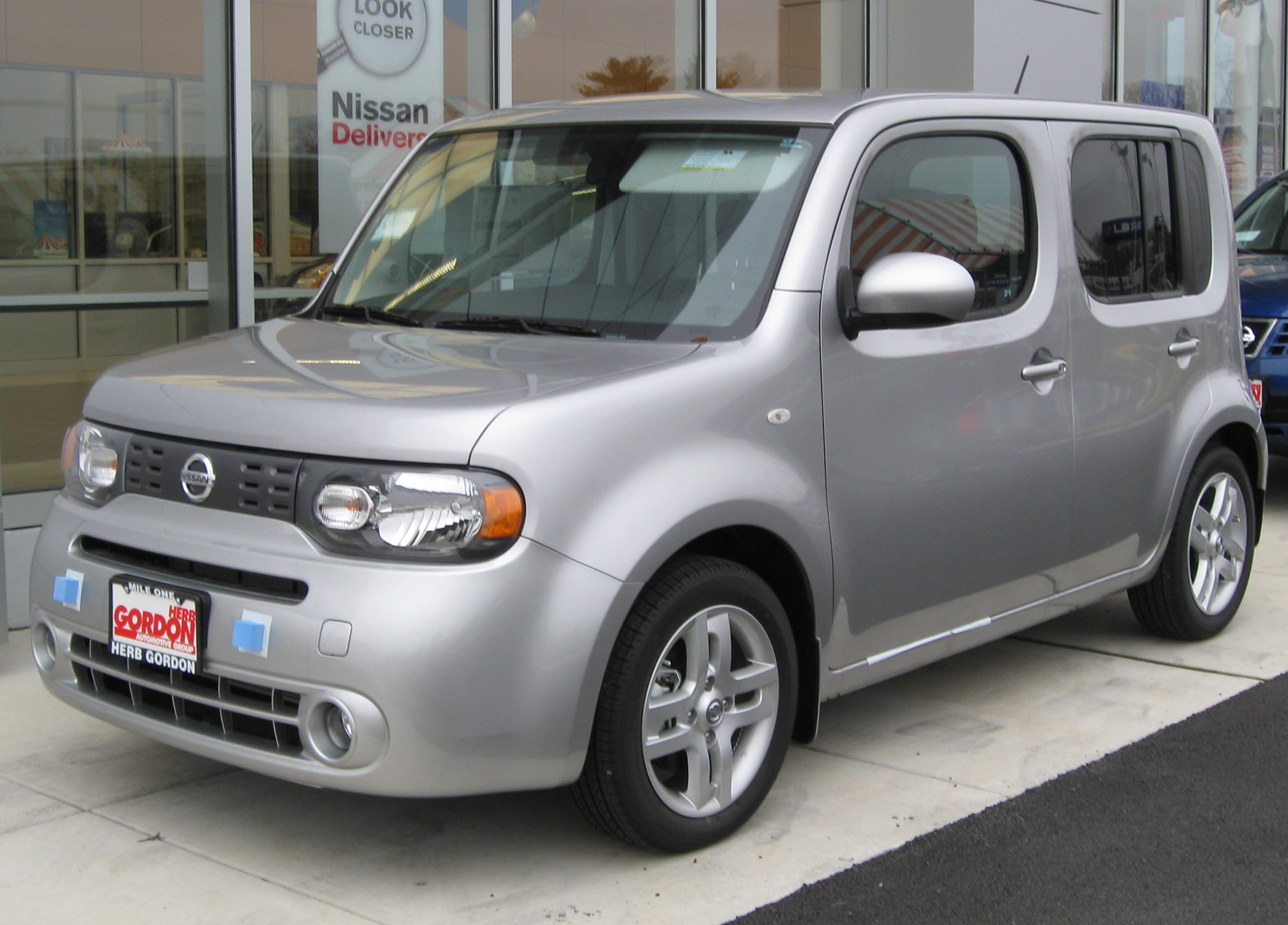
Nissan Cube (2009–2019)

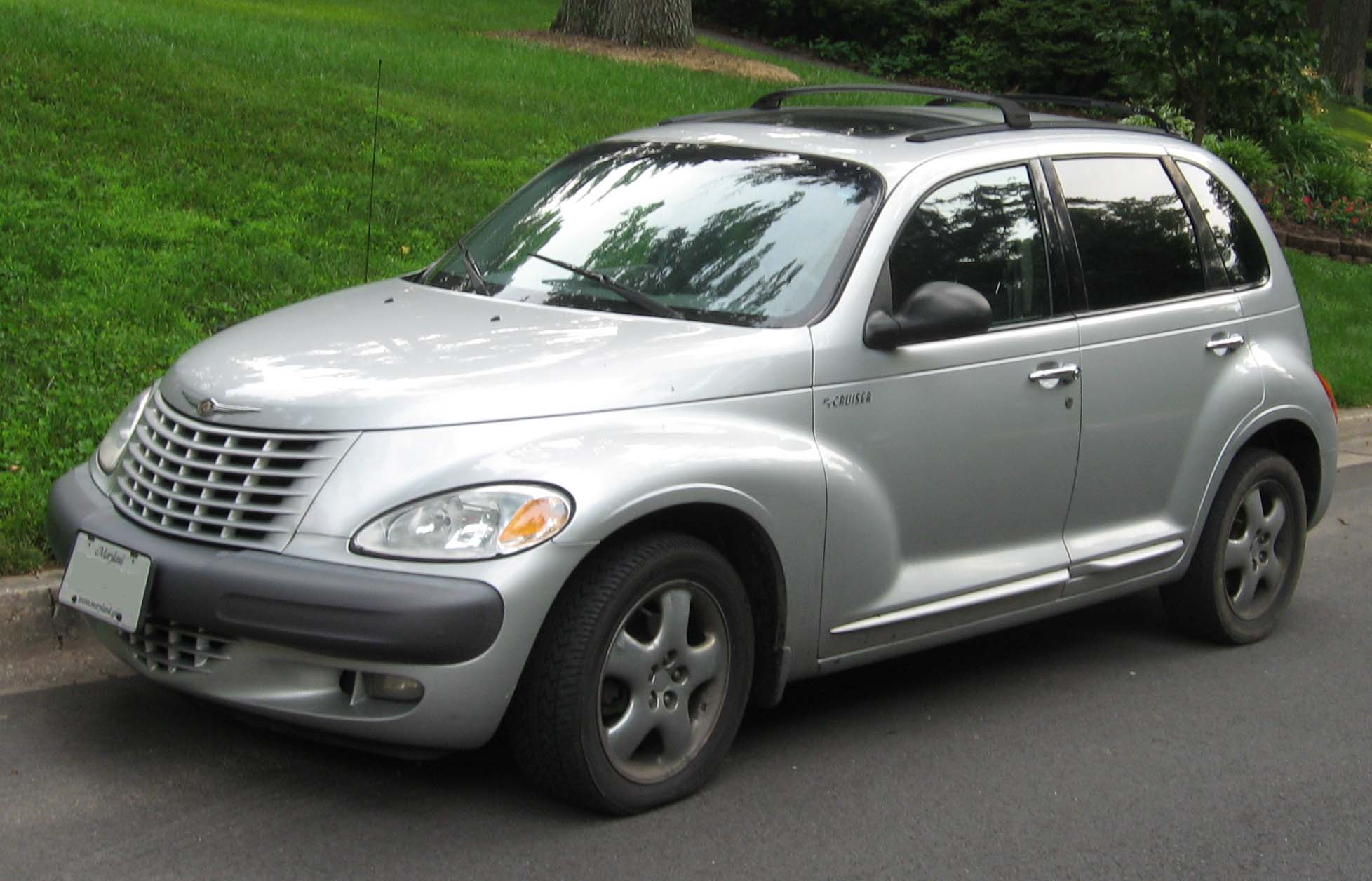
Chrysler PT Cruiser (2000–2010)

== Market share ==
=== Europe ===
In 2018, sales of mini-MPVs in Europe represented 1% of the total market. The top five selling mini-MPVs in Europe in 2018 were the Toyota Voxy, Honda Freed, Hyundai ix20, Kia Venga and Ford B-Max.

The sales trend for previous years is:

- 2012: 411,833 sales
- 2013: 450,897 sales
- 2014: Sales plateaued at just over 400,000 annual sales, as sales of small crossovers increased.
- 2015: Sales fell 15% to 350,000 as small crossover segment increased. This was the lowest figure for the segment since 2003 when the first generation Opel Meriva appeared.
- 2016: By the first quarter, sales fell 20% after the 15% drop in 2015. The Fiat 500L was the segment sales leader.

=== North America ===
In the United States, the mini-MPV category has included the Fiat 500L, with 30,000 sales from 2013 to 2017.

In Canada, as of 2013, the market for mini-MPV's was not "large, and even the overarching minivan segment is gradually shrinking as the industry expands."
