= Sliding door (car) =

Type of vehicle door

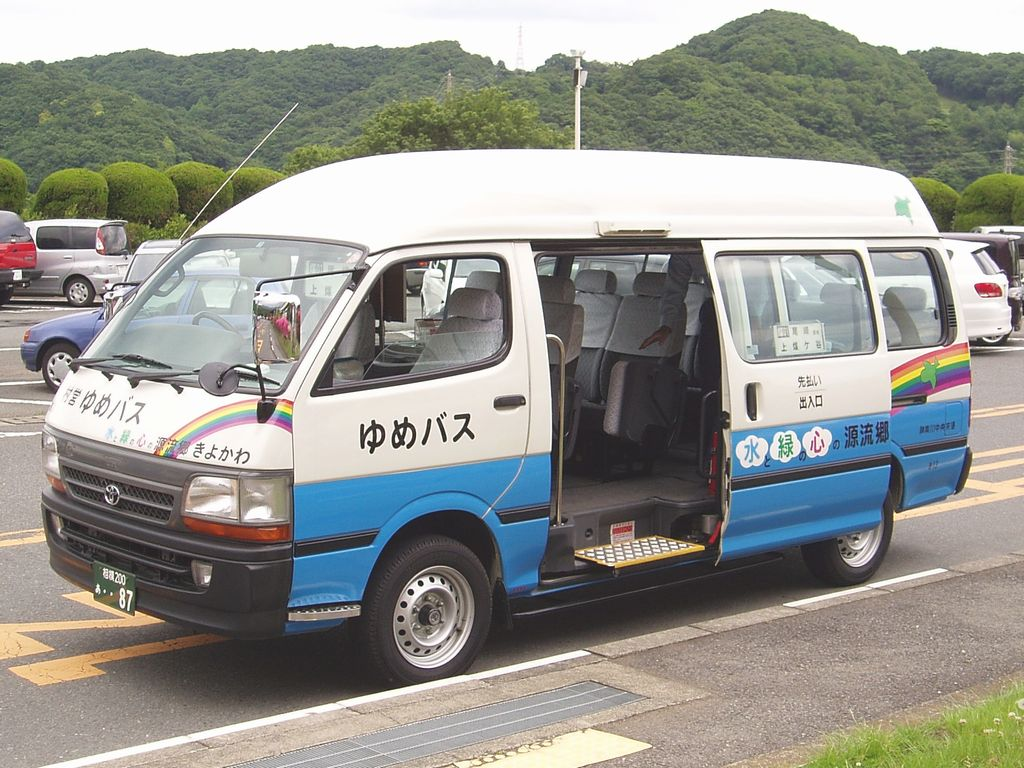
A Toyota HiAce minibus/schoolvan with a sliding door

A sliding door is a type of door that is mounted on or suspended from a track for the door to slide, usually horizontally and outside. It is a feature predominantly found in minibuses, buses, minivans and vans, so as to allow a large unobstructed access to the interior for loading and unloading of passengers or cargo without the doors interfering with adjacent space.

== Conventional styles ==
Sliding doors are often used on the outside of mini MPVs, such as the Toyota Porte, Peugeot 1007 and Renault Kangoo, but are more commonly used in full-sized MPVs like the Toyota Previa, the Citroën C8, the Peugeot 807, the Chrysler Voyager and the Kia Carnival. Their use has increased over the years as MPVs have increased in popularity, because it gives easy access and makes parking in tight spaces possible. The most common type of sliding door, that has a three-point suspension and opens outwards, then runs along the side of the vehicle, was introduced in 1964 by Volkswagen AG as an option on its Type 2 vans.

=== Pocket doors ===
A pocket door is a sliding door that slides along its width and disappears, when open, into a compartment in the adjacent wall, or as in terms of vehicles, into the vehicle's bodywork. Pocket doors are used in some delivery vans, as well as, for example, the Renault Estafette and Morris J4, and train carriages, such as the London Underground 1973 Stock, but rarely in cars. Montreal Metro MR-63 and MR-73 wagons have two panel pocket doors. The 1954 Kaiser Darrin had a unique setup pocket doors that would slide into the front fender. Because of this the doors had no side windows installed on them.

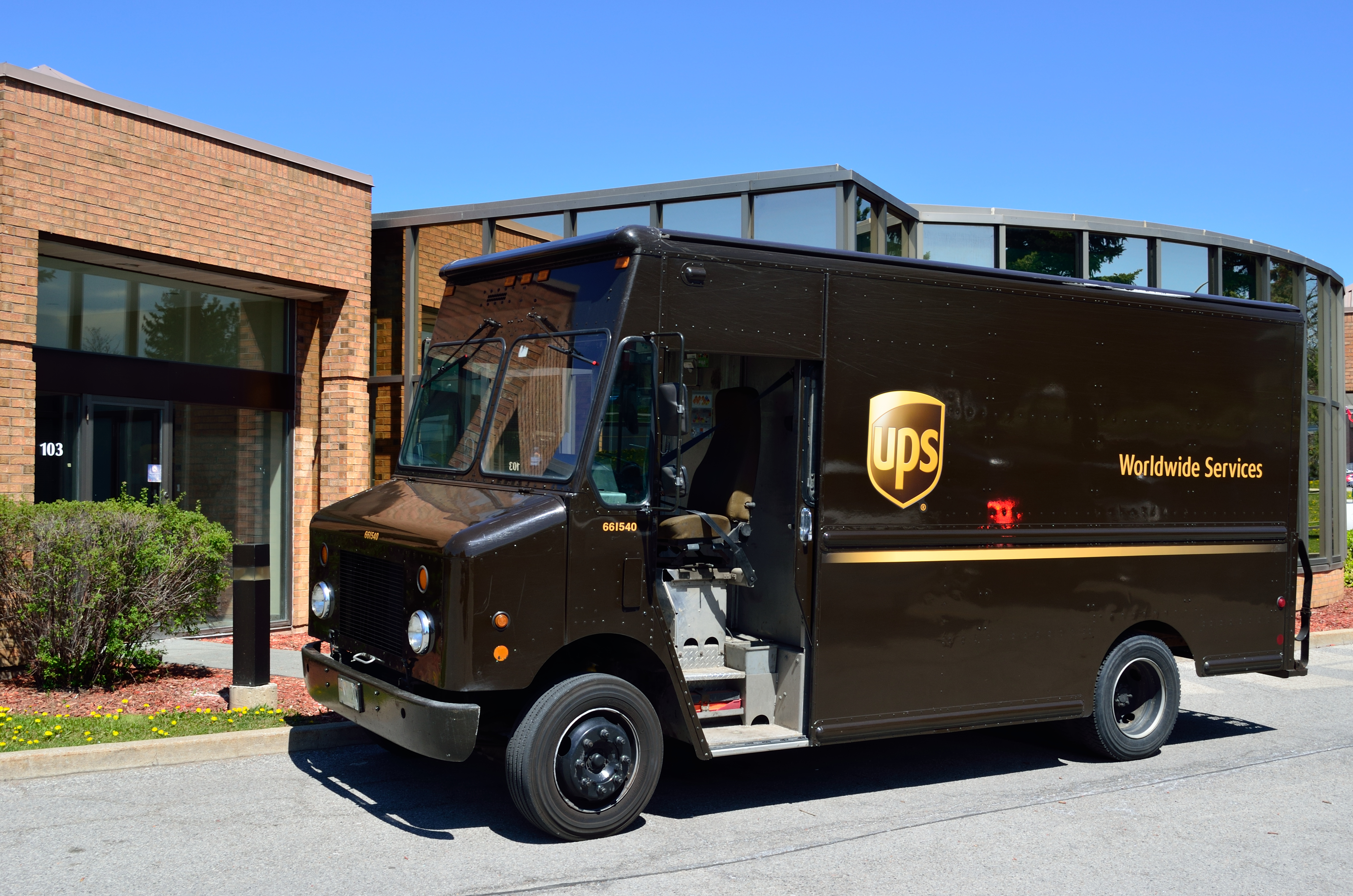
Delivery van – pocket door slides rearward into the side

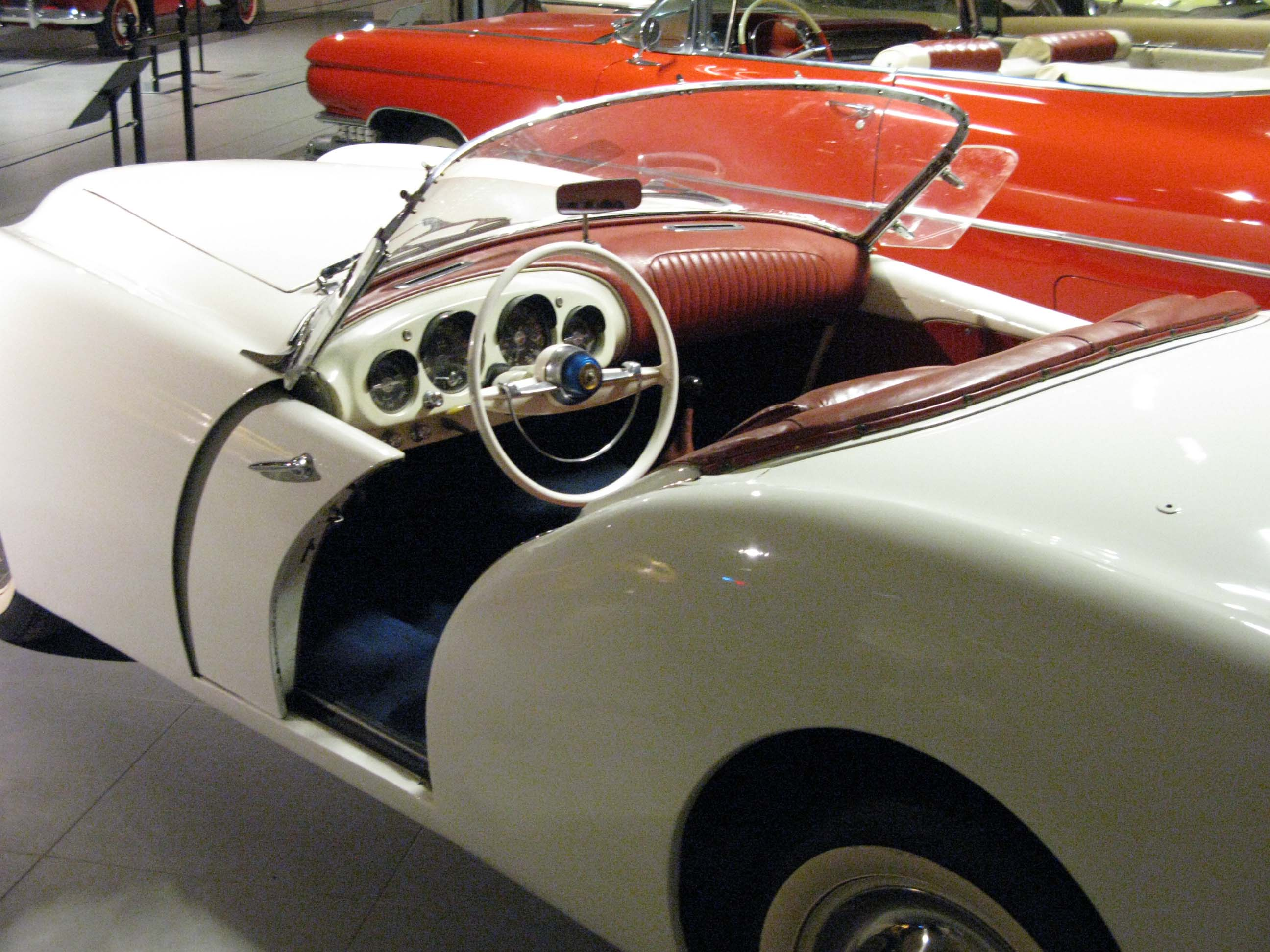
1954 Kaiser Darrin's sliding pocket doors into the front fender

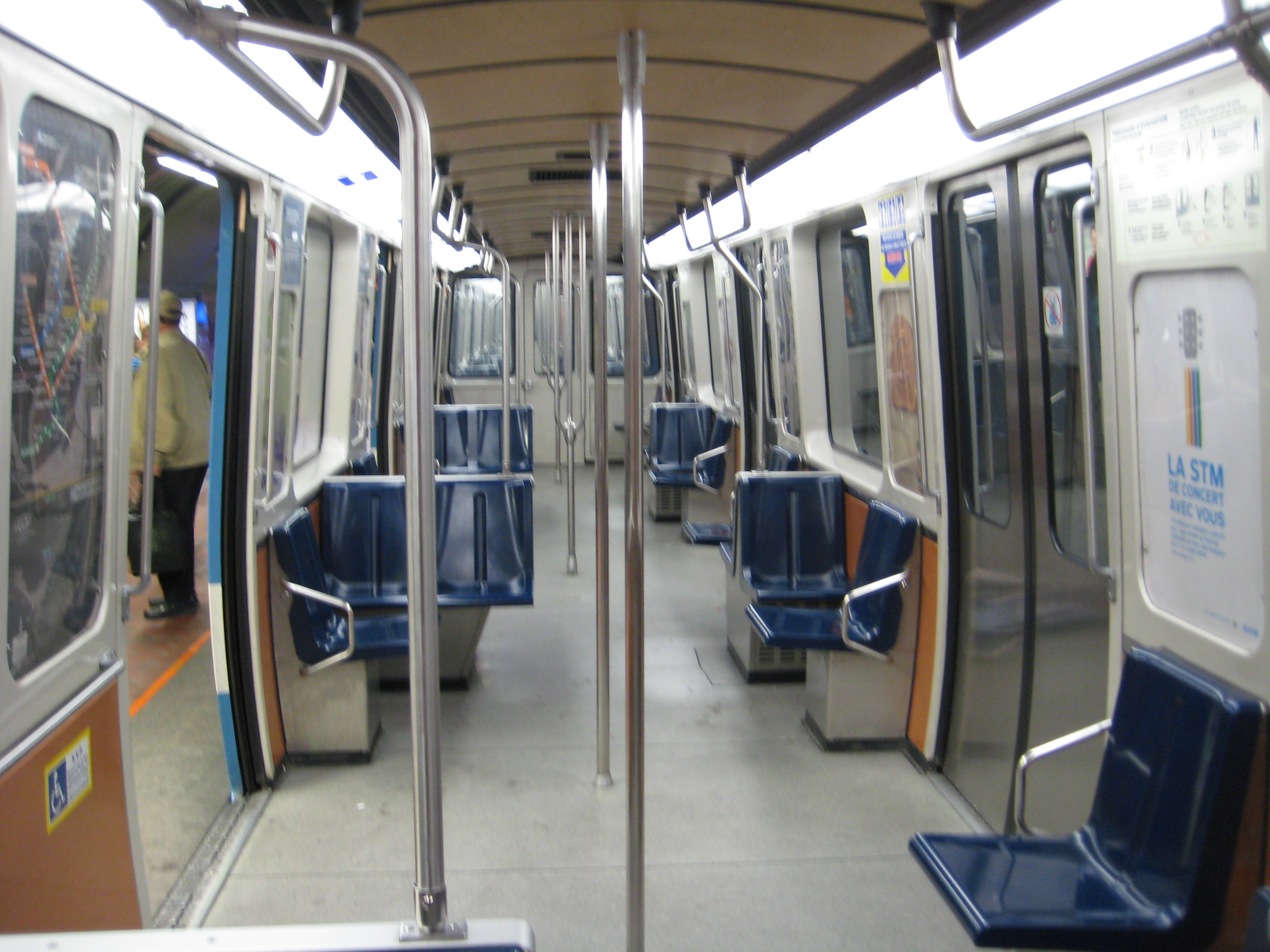
Interior of an MR-73 train showing the two panel pocket door to the right

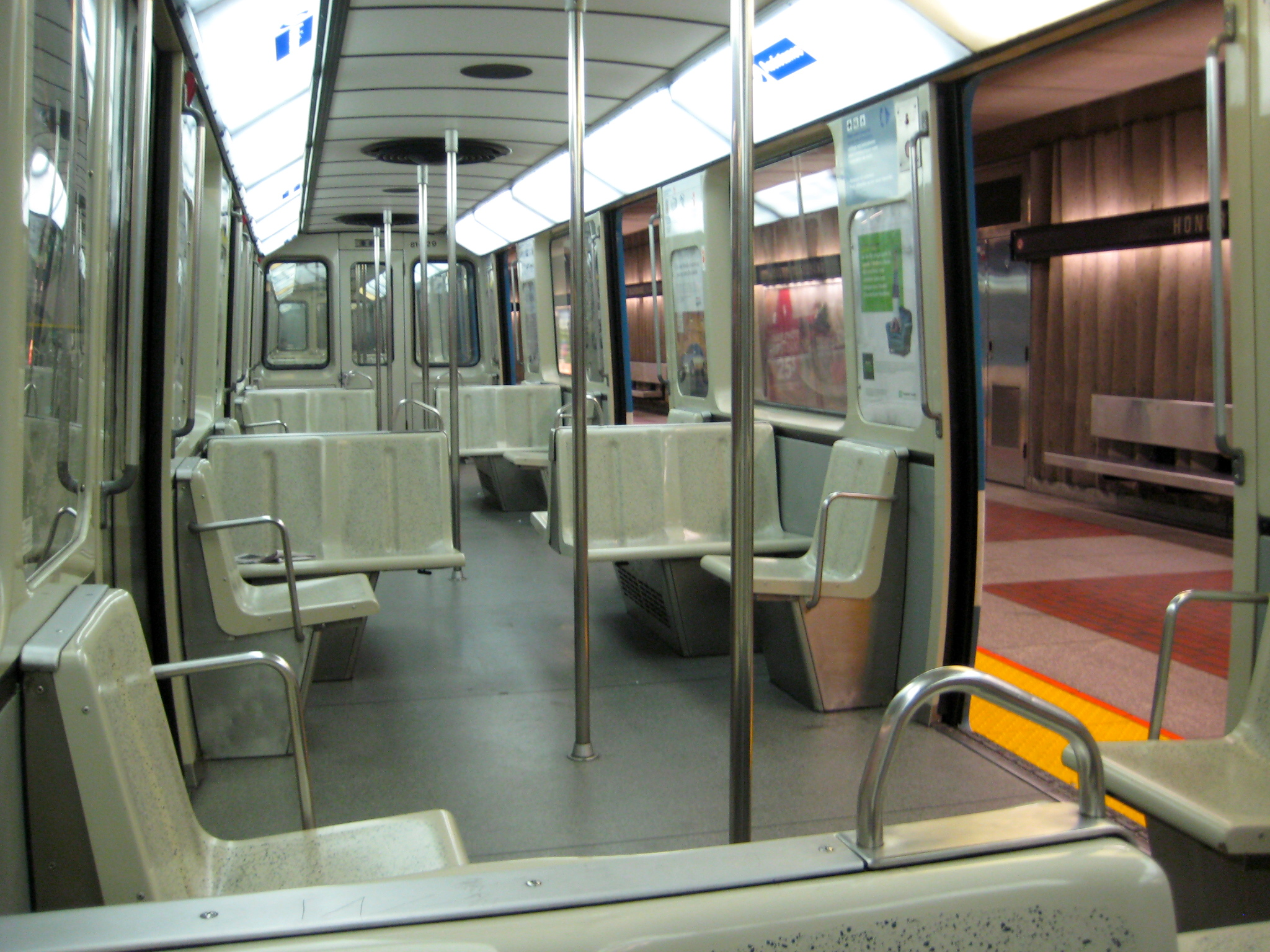
Interior of an MR-63 train showing the open two panel pocket door to the right

=== Buses ===
Sliding plug doors on a bus have pantographic hinges that move the door panel outwards from its plug socket and then parallel to the side of the bus to clear the opening. On closing, the door is wedged and locked into the opening. This arrangement makes a very good airtight and soundproof seal and is commonly found on coaches.

=== Passenger trains ===
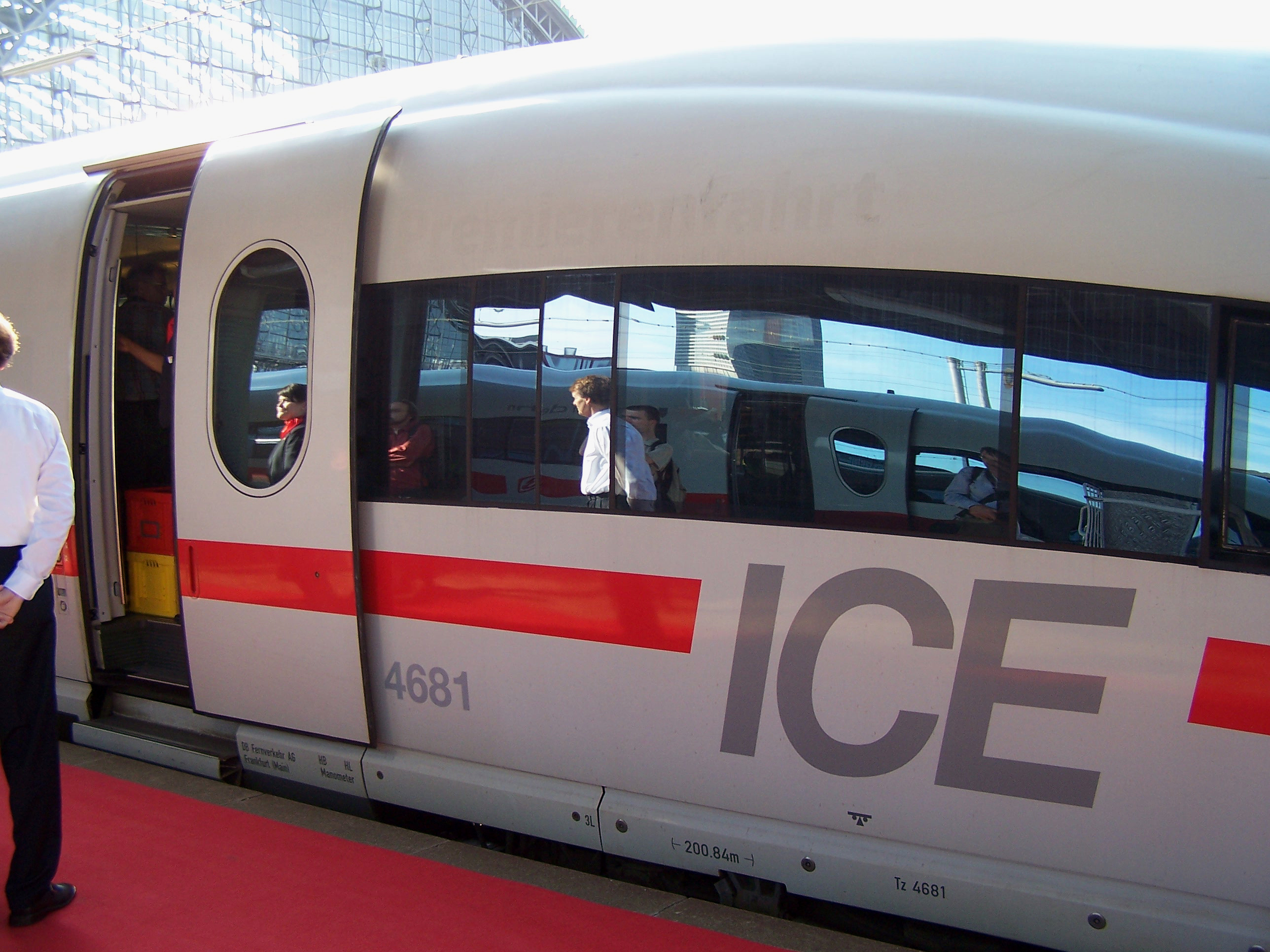
High-speed ICE train

Many passenger train cars use plug doors. On commuter and regional trains doors of plug design take less room than sliding doors, but may restrict the compatibility of a car with high passenger platforms since these doors open outwards.

High-speed trains use sliding plug doors because they can be made airtight, soundproof and reduce aerodynamic drag.

== Unconventional styles ==
=== Inner-track sliding door ===
Opens normally like a traditional van sliding door, but unlike most sliding doors where the track is on the exterior of the vehicle, this type has it inside and on the side of the door itself. This allows the exterior to remain clean in design and yet the door can slide outside past the trailing edge of the car. This design is very uncommon; it has only been used on Mitsubishi vehicles, and was invented by Mitsubishi Motors. The first vehicle to use it was the Mitsubishi RVR Space Runner; it was designed because the RVR is a short car compared to the size of the siding door, making it incapable of having a track on the exterior of the car. Thus, the inner-track mechanism was used so the sliding door can slide open wide enough to let passengers enter and exit the car easily. The new Mitsubishi EK Wagon/Nissan Otti also uses this type of sliding door, but has it only on one side while the driver's side door of the back seats is a normal hinge door. The sliding door of the EK wagon is also electric-powered.

=== Vertical doors ===
A vertical door is a type of sliding door that slides vertically, usually on a rail or track.

==== 1989–1991 BMW Z1 ====
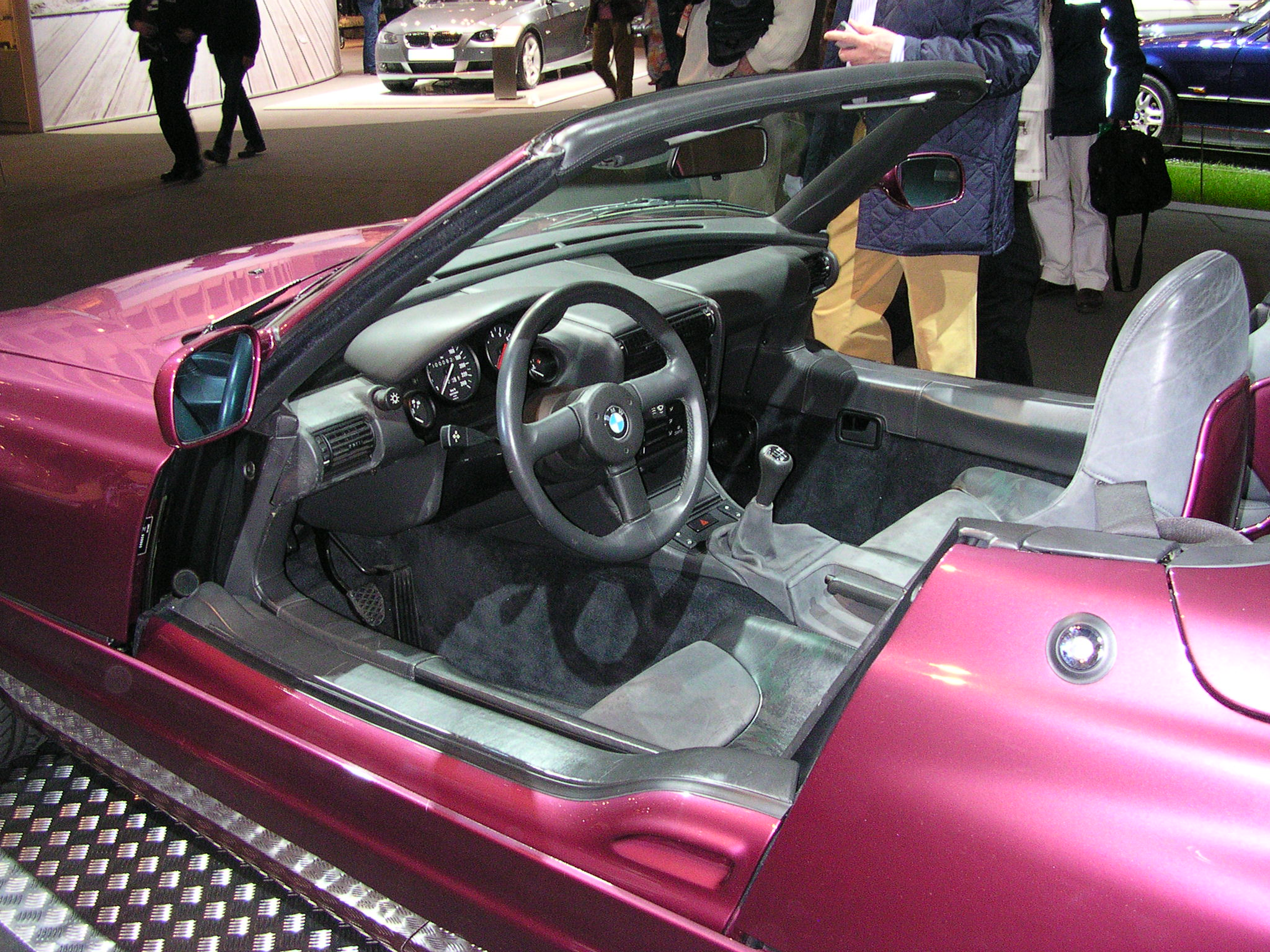
A BMW Z1 with its doors open

The BMW Z1's doors slide vertically down into the car's chassis. This means that they slide into a compartment within the car's body and so are also technically pocket doors, but they are not classified as such because they do not slide along their length into an adjacent compartment. The inspiration for these doors came from traditional roadsters which often feature removable metal or cloth doors. Because removable doors did not fit within BMW's design goals, the vertical-sliding doors were installed instead.

Because the doors slide vertically downwards into the body, the top halves of the sides of the car slide into the bottom half. The high sills can make entry and exit harder, although they do offer crash protection independent of the doors; therefore, the vehicle may be legally and safely driven with the doors up or down. The windows can be operated independently of the doors, although they will automatically retract if the door is lowered.

==== 1993 Lincoln Mark VIII concept car ====
The Lincoln Mark VIII concept car's doors slide into the frame underbody and disappear from view. By doing this, it solved the problem of a high door sill that the Z1 experienced. However, this design is much more complicated, so the risk of failure is increased. Also, all of the mechanisms to make the doors work add a significant amount of weight to the car, slowing it down, and making it less efficient.

This was designed because Lincoln executives were concerned about the large, heavy doors on the Mark VIII and wanted to improve them, especially for cities with tight parking spaces. They had the idea of a Mark VIII that had doors that disappeared beneath the car and would require no additional space outside the car's wheelbase for the doors to open in order to allow people to enter or exit. At this time it was usual for the large car manufacturers to sub-contract their concepts to other companies who specialized in design and construction based on a concept. In this case, this Mark VIII was sent to Joalto near Detroit. Joalto still holds many United States patents for with this vehicle's chassis and body construction.

Joalto Design Inc. built this one-of-a-kind concept car and shipped it to Lincoln for executive approval for production. The executives disliked the design and ordered the prototype destroyed. Instead, the vehicle was sold on eBay in September 2007.

== See also ==
- Bus doors
- Butterfly doors
- Canopy door
- Car door
- Folding bus doors
- Gull-wing doors
- List of cars with non-standard door designs
- Plug door
- Scissor doors
- Suicide doors
- Swan doors
- Vehicle canopy
