= Kaiser Darrin =

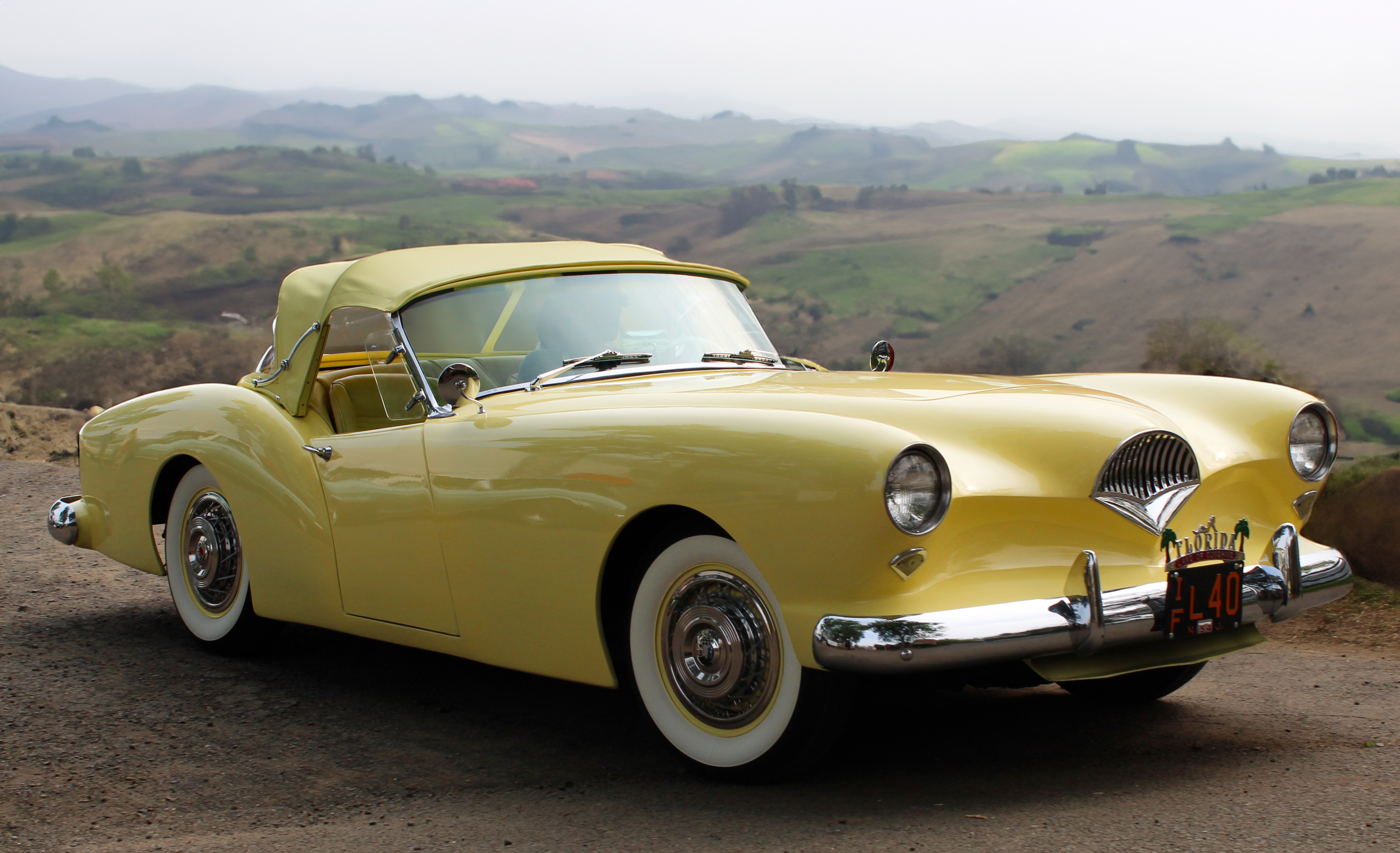

Overview
- Manufacturer: Kaiser Motors
- Production: 1954 (435 produced)
- Designer: Howard "Dutch" Darrin

Body and chassis
- Class: Sports car
- Body style: 2-door roadster
- Doors: Sliding

Powertrain
- Engine: 161 cu in (2.6 L) F-head six cylinder, 90-hp
- Transmission: Three-speed manual with overdrive

Dimensions
- Wheelbase: 100.0 in (2,540 mm)
- Length: 184.1 in (4,676 mm)

The Kaiser Darrin, also known as the Kaiser Darrin 161 or in short as the Darrin, was an American sports car designed by Howard "Dutch" Darrin and built by Kaiser Motors for the 1954 model year. Essentially a revamp of Kaiser's Henry J compact, the Kaiser Darrin was one of its designer's final achievements and was noted for being the second (behind the 1953 Corvette) American car equipped with a fiberglass body, and for doors that slid on tracks into the front fender wells. The car was named both for Henry J. Kaiser, head of Kaiser Motors, and Darrin.

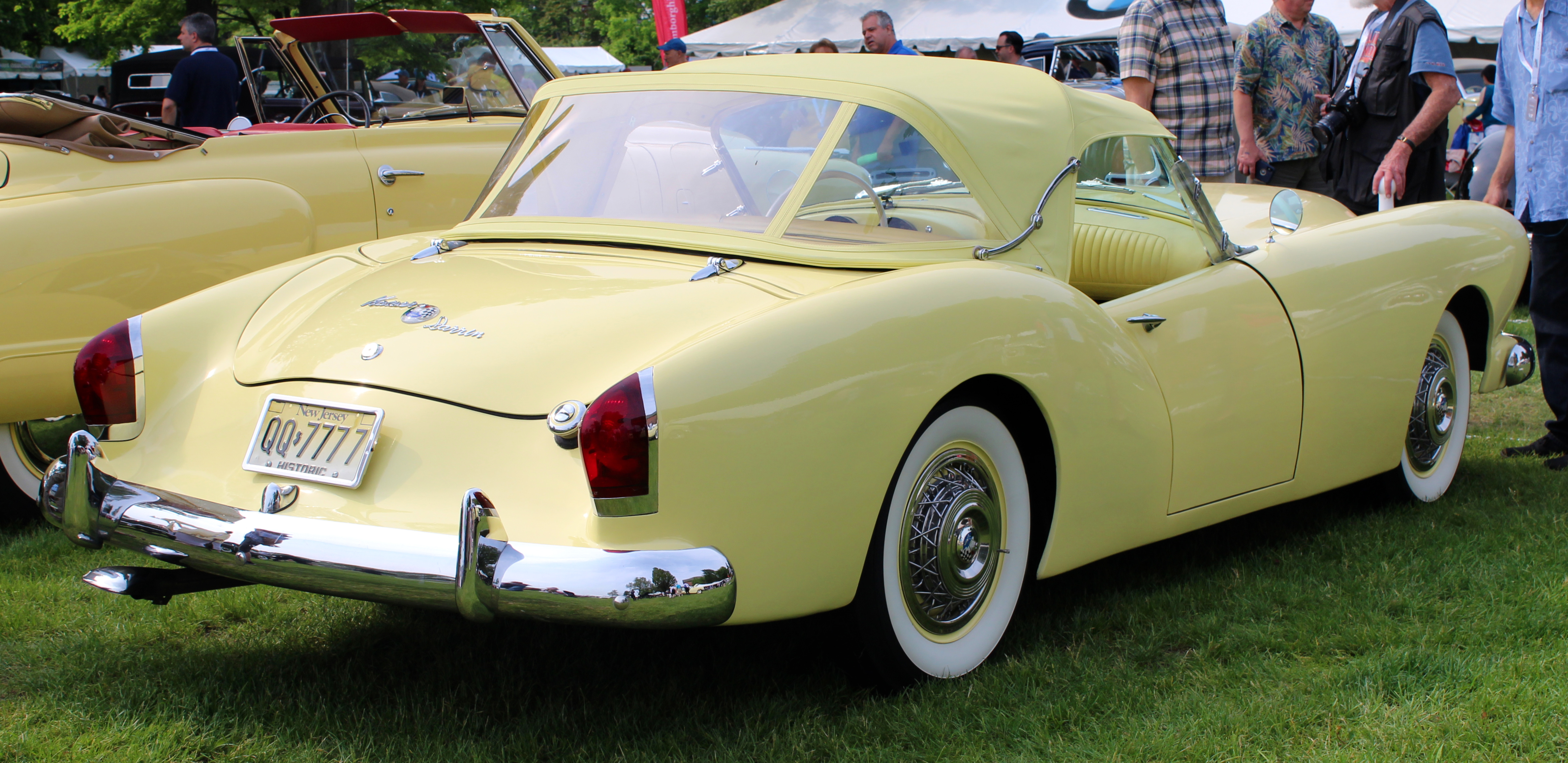
Kaiser Darrin rear view with the Landau top up

The Darrin was conceived as part of a movement in Detroit to compete head-to-head with European roadsters being imported to and sold in the United States in the post–World War II period. Among other products developed were the Ford Thunderbird in its initial two-seat form and Chevrolet Corvette. While the Darrin received praise for its design, it was considered underpowered and, while a good performer overall, did not measure up to foreign vehicles such as the Nash-Healey or Triumph TR2. The Darrin's high price tag, lack of consumer confidence in Kaiser's viability and practical challenges with the car's design resulted in low sales, though sports cars at the time were generally not fast sellers.

Only 435 production Darrins and six prototypes were built. Crumbling corporate finances, pending loss of assembly facilities and a freak snowstorm that reportedly ruined 50 of the cars all conspired to terminate the program. Darrin bought those 50 vehicles and whatever others Kaiser had left in storage and sold those from his Hollywood, California showroom. Many of the cars' engines were retrofitted with superchargers and multiple carburation to improve performance. Six were rumored to have been re-engined with Cadillac Eldorado V-8 units, however, none have survived subjecting the story to some skepticism. There was one V8 engined Darrin raced at Tory Pines in November 1954 and a wrecked Darrin rebuilt into a drag racer by Lee and Gary Abrahams of Tucson, Arizona in the early 1960s.

== Background ==
=== Kaiser ===
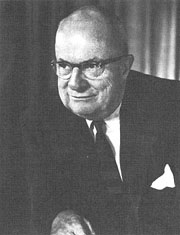
Henry J. Kaiser

By the end of his life, industrialist Henry J. Kaiser had built a personal empire which included more than 100 various companies that ranged from construction and manufacturing to health care. He had begun with a cement business in Vancouver, British Columbia. A contract to build roads in Cuba in 1927 was followed with work on the Hoover and Grand Coulee dams. In 1939, he entered the shipbuilding industry. Even though he had never built a ship before then, by 1943 he had more than 300,000 employees in seven shipyards and ultimately built 1,490 Liberty Ships during World War II. An exceptional organizer and with a penchant for lateral thinking, Kaiser tended to bulldoze his way through a problem. In areas that lacked infrastructure to support his work force, Kaiser and his son Edgar built entire cities within months. If there was a shortage of steel, he built a foundry or found a way to substitute aluminum. All that Kaiser tended to lack, according to writer Aaron Severson, was a sense of his own limitations.

Kaiser had begun to consider entering the automobile business in 1942, when the United States government halted production of civilian vehicles to focus on military ones due to the country's entry into World War II. With an eye toward postwar needs, Kaiser assembled a team of "idea men" to conceive a compact, lightweight car that the average working man could afford. By 1945, efforts had reached the prototype stage with the K-85, not a compact car but one with several advanced features, which included front wheel drive, unibody construction and a combination of torsion-bar springs and a torsion-beam rear axle called "Torsionetic Suspension." In partnership with automotive executive Joseph W. Frazer, Kaiser formed Kaiser-Frazer Corporation on July 25, 1945. Late that year, Kaiser-Frazer leased the Ford factory complex in Willow Run, near Detroit, Michigan as its manufacturing base.

Building new cars soon proved more problematic than designing them. While postwar demand for new cars meant robust sales, an ongoing shortage of capital at Kaiser-Frazer led to a split between its two founders. Kaiser wanted to expand production; Frazer wanted to retrench and economize, especially with the view that as the Big Three—Ford, Chrysler and General Motors—brought out newly designed cars, Kaiser-Frazer sales would drop. (Immediately after World War II, the Big Three had made do with cars made essentially along prewar designs in a rush to get new vehicles to market.) In early 1949, Frazer stepped down as president of Kaiser-Frazer. He was replaced by Kaiser's son Edgar and the company renamed Kaiser Motors. Frazer's concerns proved accurate. Sales slumped in 1949. Henry and Edgar Kaiser contemplated liquidation but decided against it in the hope that a new Kaiser for 1951, the Henry J, would help turn sales around.

=== Darrin ===
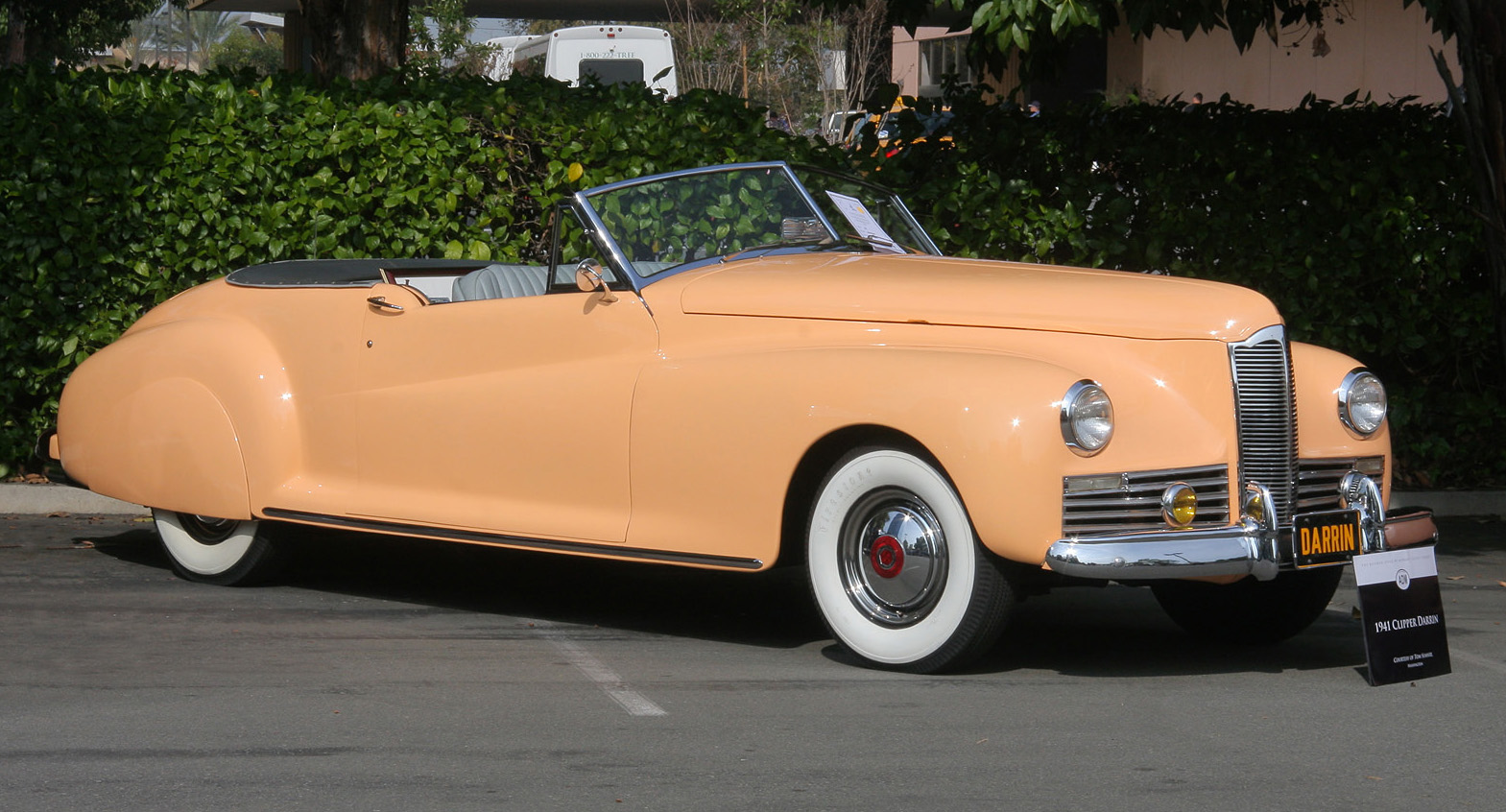
1941 Packard Clipper Darrin Convertible

American designer Howard "Dutch" Darrin began coach building in Paris in partnership with fellow American designer Thomas L. Hibbard under the name Hibbard & Darrin in 1923. While they became noted over the following years for the innovatively-styled bodies they designed for many of Europe's most prestigious chassis, the Great Depression and resultant loss of customers hit Hibbard & Darrin hard. The partnership ended in 1931 when Hibbard accepted a position in General Motors's design department under Harley Earl. While Darrin remained in France initially and formed the coach building firm of Fernandez & Darrin with a wealthy South American banker, he returned to the United States in 1937. He set up his own coachworks on Sunset Boulevard, Hollywood and worked with Packard on a number of models in the 1930s and 40s. These included the Packard 120 and Packard Clipper. One of his trademarks became a sweeping fender line which descended along the side of the car until it reached a "dip" at the head of the rear fender.

Darrin began work with Kaiser-Frazer as a freelance consultant at the end of World War II, after a plan to manufacture and sell an advanced automobile of his own design failed to materialize due to an immediate postwar shortage of raw materials. Investment banker Charles Schwartz, a friend of Darrin's who had helped arrange the financing for his plan, introduced him to Joseph Frazer. Frazer commissioned Darrin to design a car that he planned to market through the Graham-Paige automotive firm. Once Kaiser-Frazer had been incorporated, Darrin's design became the first 1947 Frazer. By 1946, Darrin had been contracted as a Kaiser-Frazer consultant. (Note: Until Kaiser and Frazer parted ways, Kaiser and Frazer automobiles were offered as two separate brands under the Kaiser-Frazer banner.)

Darrin's relationship with the company and Kaiser was stormy. Darrin's designs were generally discarded for more conventional, less attractive designs. He resigned from Kaiser-Frazer in 1946 after its "orange juicers," as he called the company's designers, had altered his design for the 1946 K-F sedan. Although Henry and Edgar Kaiser had gotten along with Darrin personally and had hired him based on his reputation in automotive circles, neither was sorry to see him go. Darrin reportedly could be mercurial, temperamental and cantankerous. He left with the impression that Kaiser-Frazer had been excluding him, especially as Joseph Frazer's influence in the company had waned. However, when Frazer asked Darrin to return two years later to work on the 1951 Kaiser, Darrin accepted. When it chose a more staid design for its Henry J compact than the one he had provided, Darrin once again resigned.

== Reclothing the Henry J ==
The Henry J had been its namesake's pet project, the result of both Kaiser and Frazer's desire to provide an affordable car to the average working man. It was also the basis for a $44 million loan from the federal Reconstruction Finance Corporation (RFC) in 1948, with the condition that the car was to go to market no later than the summer of 1950. Its wheelbase, at 100 inches (2.5 m), had been sectioned from the company's 1951 sedan which, while conventional, had proved a sound design. Moreover, the 1951 sedan had a low center of gravity and, with an uncommonly good ride, rivaled the Hudson step-down models as among the best-handling cars of its class. Contemporary testers of the Henry J such as Tom McCahill of Mechanix Illustrated and Floyd Clymer of Popular Mechanics pointed out the car's poor quality of assembly but praised the Henry J's performance. Automotive writer Aaron Severson, in his article "Dressed to Kill: The 1954 Kaiser Darrin," called the Henry J's roadability an "agreeable blend of ride comfort and maneuverability" and its engine "sprightly, if not particularly fast."

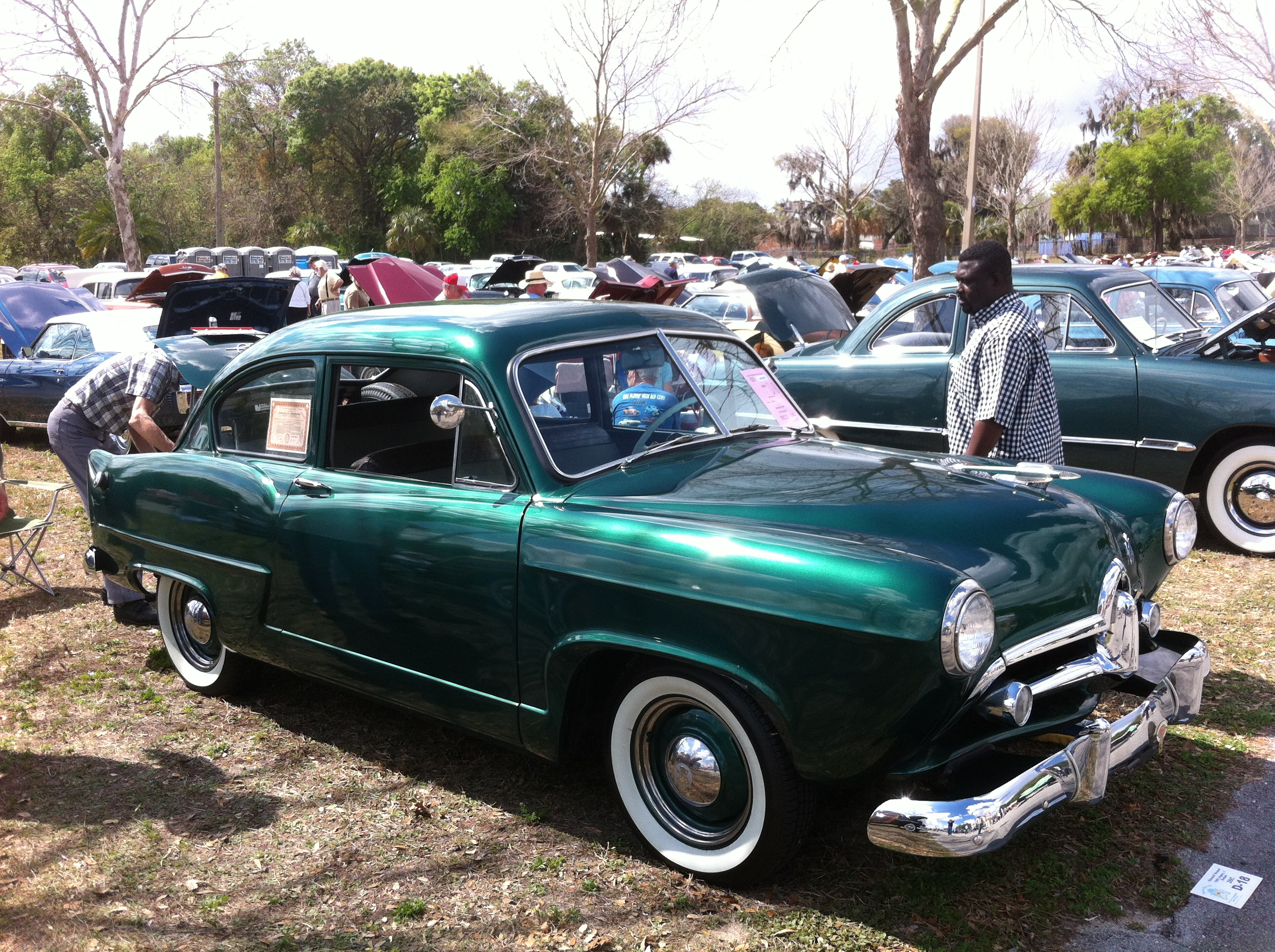
1951 Kaiser Henry J

Darrin felt that the Henry J deserved better than the boxy design with which it had been outfitted and set out to prove it. Using his own funds and without notifying Kaiser, Darrin produced a 2-seat roadster design. After he had completed a clay model in the first half of 1952, Darrin contacted Bill Tritt, who had pioneered the use of glass-reinforced plastic (GRP, commonly known as fiberglass) in sports car bodies to have him produce a prototype. This body was shipped to Darrin's design shop in Santa Monica, California, and mated to a Henry J chassis. Once the prototype was finished, Darrin invited Kaiser to see the car.

Kaiser, predictably, became upset at the sight of the new car. He roared, "We are not in the business of selling sports cars," he chastised Darrin for proceeding with the project without his knowledge. (Note: Kaiser had in fact already been approached by designer Brooks Stevens in 1951 to build a two-seat roadster, based on the Anglo-American Nash-Healey, called the Excaliber J. Kaiser had passed. (Severson, "Dressed to Kill")) Darrin answered that the car had not been built on company time and that he had funded it himself. "Furthermore," he added, "if you don't build the car under the Kaiser banner, I'll build it myself." At this point, Kaiser's new, younger wife, who had accompanied him to the shop, told her husband, "This is the most beautiful thing I have ever seen. I don't see why you aren't in the business of building sports cars. I don't think there will be many automobile companies that won't go into the sports car business after seeing this car." Those words changed Kaiser's mind. By the end of the viewing, he had not only embraced the building of the car but also green-lighted development of a four-door version. Months later, Kaiser showed his appreciation by having the new sports car named the Kaiser Darrin.

As it turned out, there was actually a rush in progress among American car manufacturers to produce a two-seat roadster that would rival British imports. Ford Motor Company was developing the initial version of its Thunderbird and General Motors was working on the Chevrolet Corvette. Darrin's work predated both these projects.

== Design ==
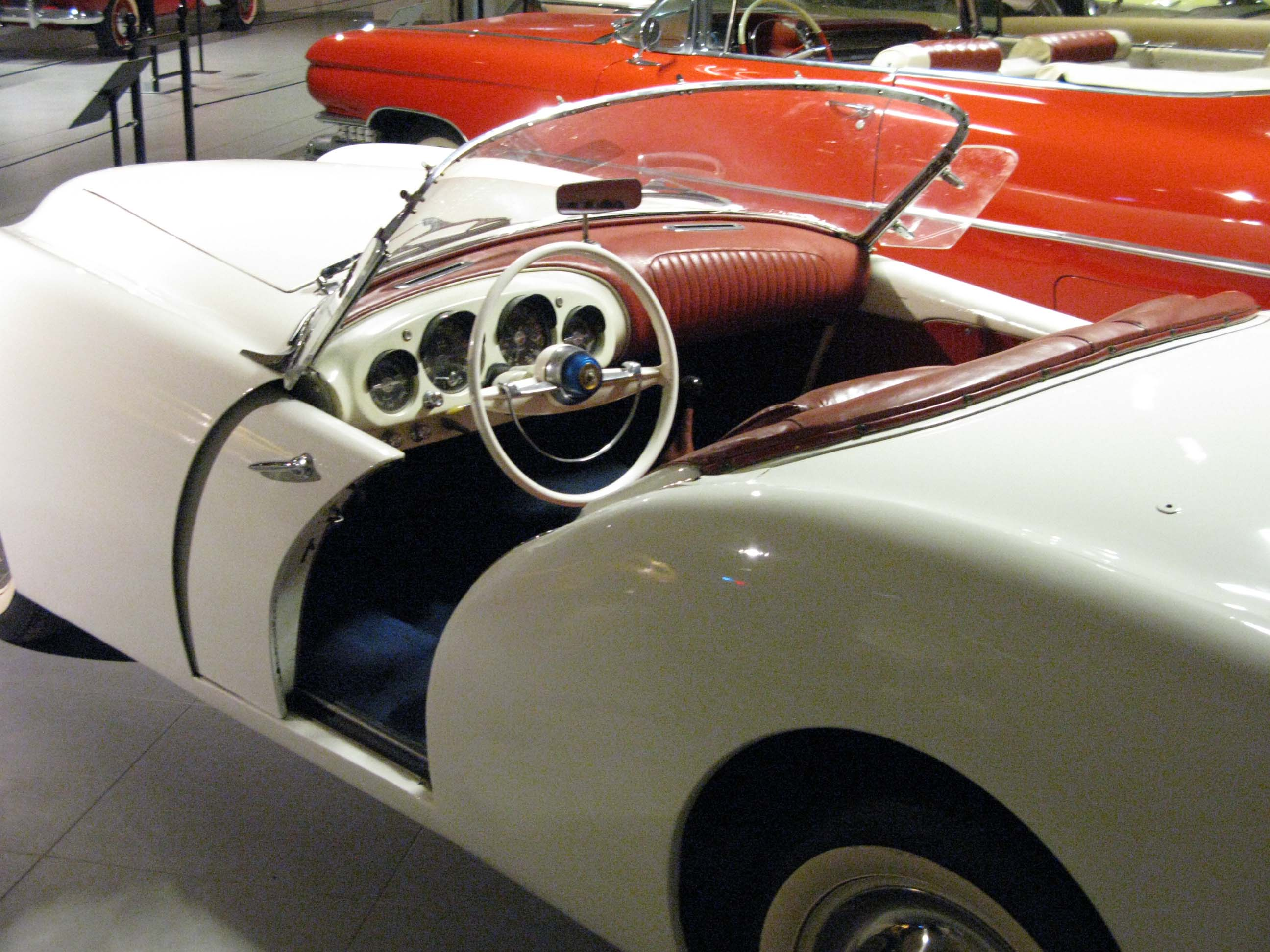
Driver's side view of Kaiser Darrin. Note padded dashboard and sliding entry door.

Along with Darrin's trademark fender line, the Kaiser Darrin had entry doors that, instead of being hinged to open outward, slid on tracks into the front fender wells behind the front wheels. Fueled by Darrin's dislike for conventional doors, the designer had taken out a patent on the sliding auto door concept in 1946. To keep the door assembly as simple as possible, no side windows were built into them. The car was equipped with a three-position Landau top, which was also considered novel, and the design on the whole considered by industry critics and writers as beautifully proportioned. The only flaw was considered the car's front grille. High and shell-shaped, it looked as though the automobile "wanted to give you a kiss," as one writer commented.

As with the prototype, the body for the production Kaiser Darrin was made of fiberglass. More resilient than aluminum, fiberglass did not rot or corrode, was lightweight and more pliable than steel to mold into shape. The molds were far less expensive than the tooling needed to bend and shape steel. This could theoretically make a fiberglass-bodied car economical for a small private manufacturer such as Kaiser to produce. The body was molded in two sections, minus deck lid, doors and hood. Underneath, the frame rails of the Henry J were modified to allow for a lower ride height, the steering ratio altered and the spring and damping rates changed to match the lighter body. The car was offered initially in four colors—Champagne Lacquer (white), Red Sail Lacquer, Yellow Satin Lacquer, and Pine Tint Lacquer (green)—with lacquer paints specified because fiberglass could not withstand the temperatures needed to bake enamel onto it. Tritt's company, Glasspar, was commissioned to produce bodies for the production model. However, Glasspar produced only a handful of these. The remaining 435 were produced in-house by Kaiser. Glasspar did continue to produce the deck lids (trunk, top compartment, and engine hood) and doors.

Several changes were necessitated to put the car into production. Only two of these angered the designer but were deemed necessary to meet vehicle regulations in several states—raising the headlights four inches and adding turn signals below them. Other alterations included separate lids for the trunk and top well instead of the one-piece lid on the prototype, a one-piece windshield without a "sweetheart dip" in place of a split windshield, an amended interior and a dashboard display with the instruments clustered ahead of the steering wheel instead of spread across the panel. Interior features included color-keyed vinyl bucket seats, available in red, white, black, or Pine Tint (green), and a carpeted floor. (Note: Some sources claim that leather seats were available by special order (Severson, "Dressed to Kill")) Seat belts, which were not widely available on American cars at this time, were listed as an option, however, there were no attachment points built into the frame or body.

== Production ==
=== Delays ===
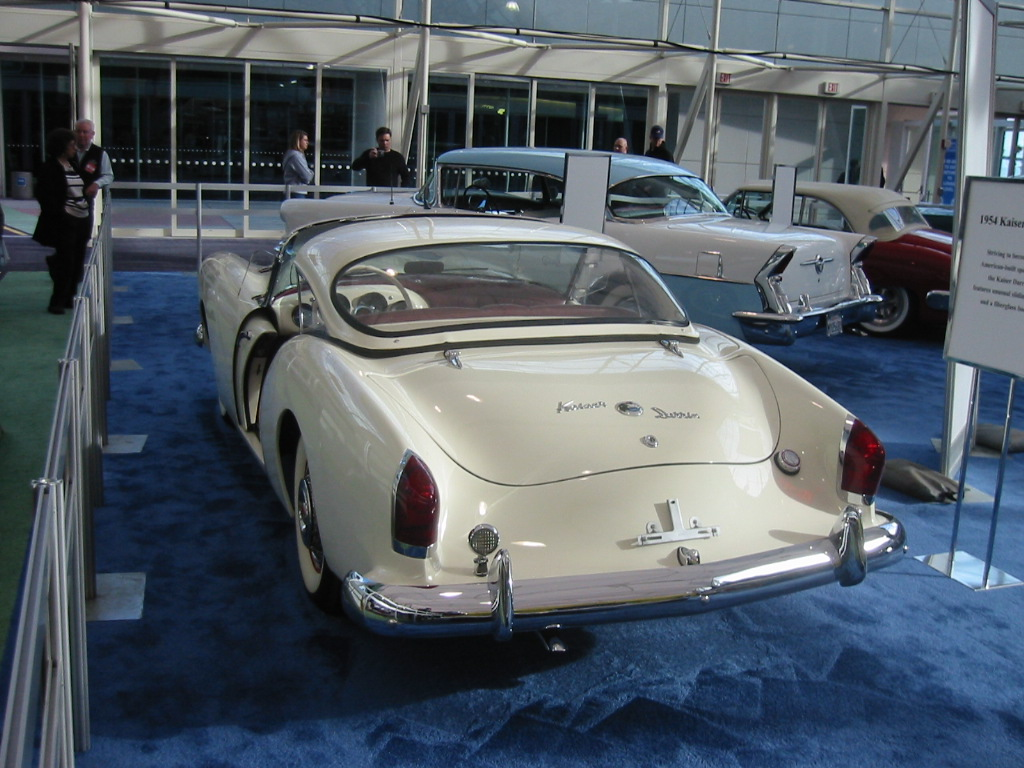
Rear view of Kaiser Darrin with a hard top

The prototype Darrin was unveiled to the public in November 1952 (two months before General Motors debuted the Corvette) at the Los Angeles Motorama, an event founded by Hot Rod and Motor Trend publisher Robert E. Petersen in 1950 to cater to hot rod and custom car enthusiasts. Public and media response to the Darrin was positive, with the roadster dubbed "the sports car that everyone has been waiting for." At the 1953 New York Auto Show, Kaiser Motors announced that the Darrin would be available by that autumn. However, production models did not reach showrooms until January 1954, after the Corvette had entered the market.

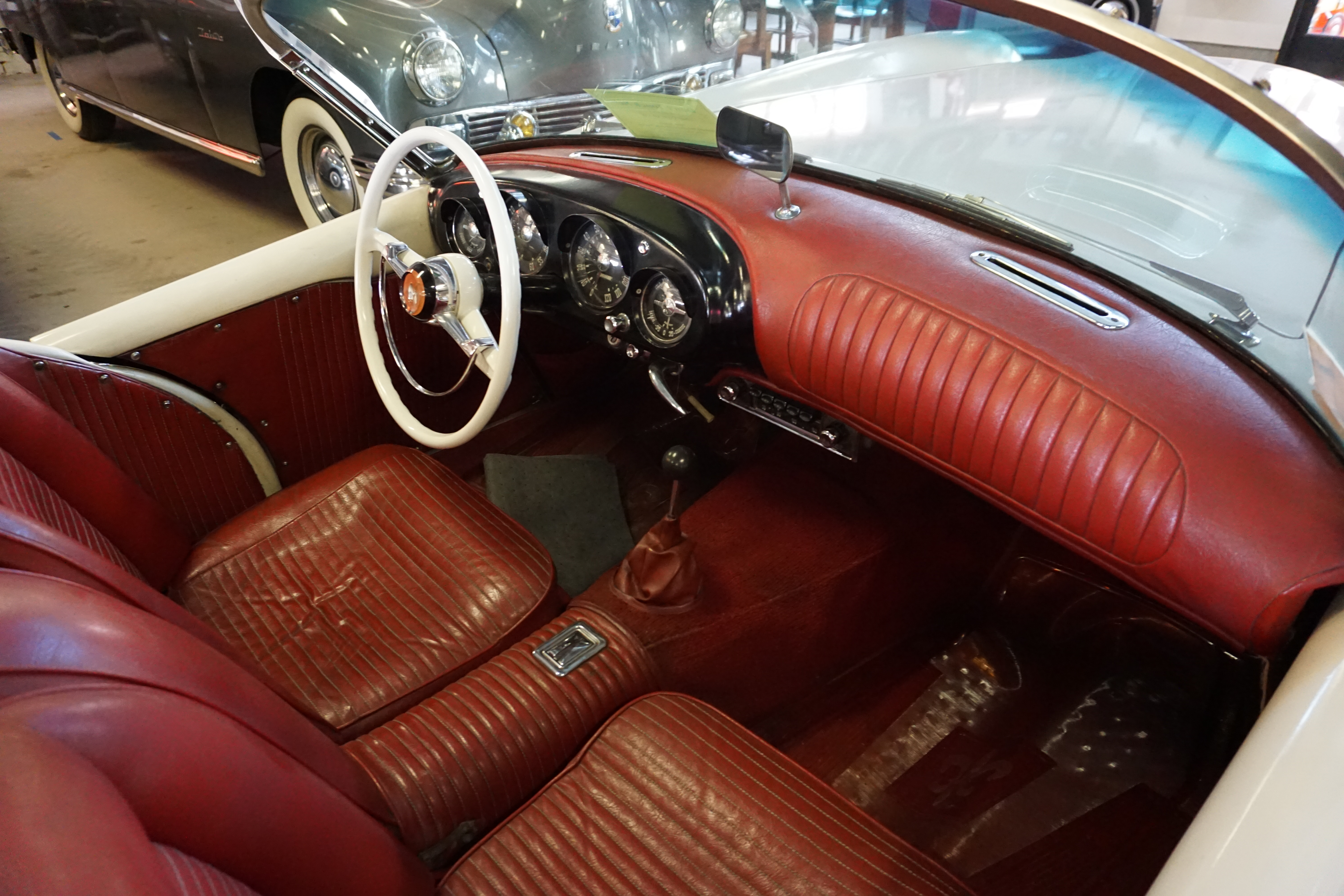
1954 Kaiser Darrin interior

Among the factors that caused delay was the lack of an adequate powerplant. While the prototype had used a standard Henry J drivetrain, even Kaiser himself realized that a sports car needed more power than that engine could offer. Kaiser engineers had developed an overhead-valve V8 engine but the company had lacked the money to build it. Kaiser had then turned to Oldsmobile but the price for its 303-cubic-inch Rocket V8 became prohibitive when Olds raised its price halfway through negotiations. For the Darrin, Kaiser engineers modified a Henry J engine, giving it a high compression aluminum head, a hotter camshaft and a three-carburetor set-up. These changes added 25 horsepower to the output but increased valve and piston damage and affected drivability negatively.

In March 1953, Kaiser merged with Willys-Overland to form Willys Motors Incorporated. Kaiser subsequently moved production to the Willys plant in Toledo, Ohio. The merger also offered an alternative engine choice for the Darrin. When the modified Kaiser J engine did not prove practical, Kaiser engineers decided to try the F-head six-cylinder Willys Hurricane. The Hurricane offered only six horsepower more than the Kaiser engine but was built more strongly and seemed to hold up better to the increased forces of supercharging. Unfortunately, just as the engine issue was being resolved, a labor strike shut down the Willow Run plant where the engine was made. Pilot production on the Darrin did not commence until August 1953. Full production finally began that December.

=== Slow sales and design flaws ===
When the car finally hit the market, its price, at $3668, was higher than the Cadillac 62 or Lincoln Capri luxury cars but came equipped with tachometer, electric windshield wipers, tinted windshield, windwings and whitewall tires. Because of the car's price and lack of performance, sales were low. The Darrin's unexceptional road performance did not help. A Willys Hurricane-6 produced 90 bhp, which allowed the car to reach a top speed of just 95 miles per hour (153 km/h) and go from 0 to 60 miles per hour (97 km/h) in around 15 seconds. While this was faster than the inexpensive MG TF, it was slower than the Alfa Romeo Giulietta Spider and Triumph TR2. Compared to the larger-engined Corvette, Nash-Healey and Jaguar XK120, the Darrin was completely outclassed. Also, while the Darrin possessed quick steering, it understeered considerably with brisk cornering and was not as agile overall as its European rivals. The ride, however, was comfortable for a sports car. Its brakes, borrowed from the much heavier Kaiser Manhattan, were excellent and the car proved easy to drive.

Problems with the design also became apparent as the Darrin entered the market, especially regarding its sliding doors. While interior space was adequate, entering or exiting through the narrow door openings could prove awkward. Doors on early production vehicles tended to jam. A switch to nylon roller bushings (retrofitted to early cars) corrected the problem to some extent but owners still had to keep door tracks free of dirt, mud or debris. Also, the folding top and side curtains leaked and the heater proved inadequate. While these last two problems plagued sports cars of the time in general, they also limited the Darrin's marketability. Kaiser dealers were reluctant to order them.

=== End of production ===
Kaiser's hope that the Darrin would entice dealers to order more of the company's standard models did not prove true. By early 1954, many Kaiser franchises had either switched to other auto makers or had gone out of business. Few ordered any Darrins at all. Since consumer confidence in Kaiser's future had become low, buyers generally did not want to purchase any Kaiser, let alone one that, while considered attractive, also seemed impractical and was priced as a luxury item. A lack of orders prompted Kaiser in July to reduce the Darrin's wholesale price by about five percent. Later that month, the company's general sales manager, Roy Abernethy, offered substantial dealer incentives on all Kaisers. These included a $700 trade-in allowance on any Darrin. (Note: Abernethy would later to become president of American Motors Corporation (AMC) (Severson, "Dressed to Kill"))

While Kaiser had set a goal of selling 1,000 Darrins a year, production had not reached half that number and the factory where the Darrin was manufactured was backlogged with unsold cars. The lease on that plant, located in Jackson, Michigan, was about to expire. (Note: The warehouse building of the Jackson plant had actually been sold to Walker Manufacturing in 1953 (Severson, "Dressed to Kill")) Either a renewed lease on that facility or the establishment of a new assembly line elsewhere would be needed if Darrin production was to continue past the end of 1954. Given this and the fact that neither dealer orders nor sales showed any signs of improving, Kaiser stopped production in August 1954.

Another factor in the Darrin's demise was a freak snowstorm that hit Toledo in the winter of 1953-54. Fifty Darrins that had been stored in the yard of the Kaiser-Willys plant there remained buried in snow for several months. When they were finally dug out, their fiberglass bodies were deemed too deteriorated to sell as new and Kaiser ordered them scrapped. At this point, Darrin intervened, demanding that the company not scrap his creation. Since Darrin had retained rights to the car's design, which Kaiser had built under license, Kaiser offered him the cars at a token price as an appeasement. Darrin bought them and had them shipped to Santa Monica.

== Aftermath ==
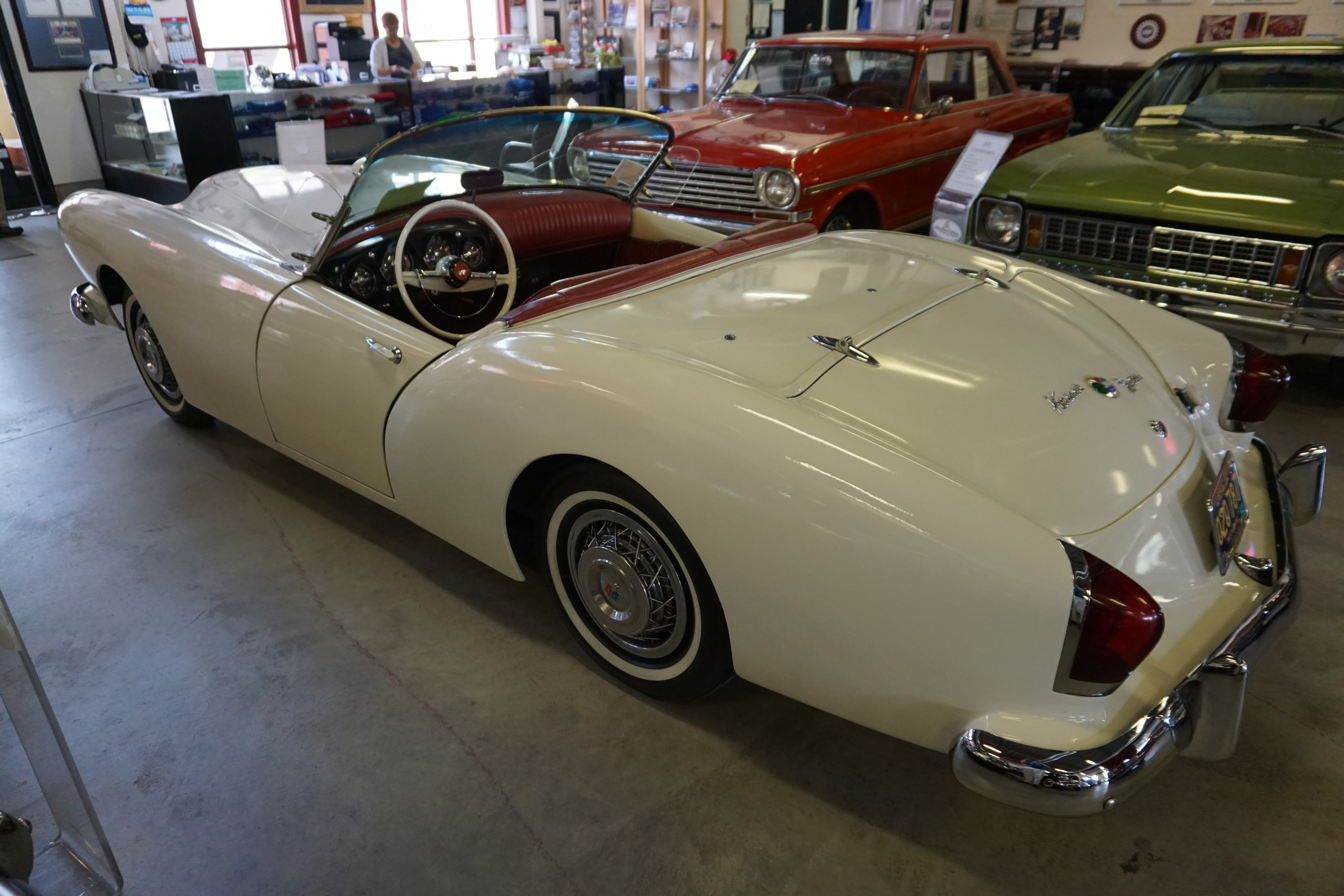
A 1954 Kaiser Darrin on display at the Ypsilanti Automotive Heritage Museum

As Kaiser exited the US consumer car market in 1955, it still had a number of Darrins in storage in its remaining facilities. Howard Darrin collected as many of them as he could, and along with the 50 write-offs that he had brought from the Toledo plant, offered them for sale from his Hollywood showroom. He retrofitted the engines of several cars with McCulloch superchargers and multiple carburetors to improve their performance. He replaced the powerplants of six cars with V-8 engines, rated at 305 bhp, used by General Motors for its Cadillac Eldorado. Darrin sold the latter as Kaiser-Darrin Specials at $4350 each.

Both of these conversions improved the Darrin's performance dramatically. Tests of the supercharged factory prototype made at Kaiser showed that the supercharged cars could go from zero to 60 miles per hour (97 km/h) in around 10 seconds and had a top speed of over 100 miles per hour (160 km/h). The Cadillac-engined Darrin Specials, according to automotive author Martyn L. Schorr, "combined the best attributes of a highly stylized sporty car with those of a hot rod." With a top speed of more than 145 miles per hour (233 km/h), some of them competed in SCCA events in the hands of owners like Laura Maxine Elmer (later to become Briggs Cunningham’s second wife), race driver Lance Reventlow and Ray Sinatra (cousin of Frank Sinatra). By 1957, the last of the roadsters had been sold.

Darrin also tried to interest the Studebaker-Packard Corporation in the four-door version suggested when he had unveiled the prototype Kaiser Darrin to Henry J. Kaiser. A single hardtop mock-up with an extended wheelbase, front and rear sliding doors and a redesigned front end was built. Studebaker-Packard, itself ailing financially, passed on the design. The whereabouts of Darrin's mock-up is unknown.

== Analysis ==
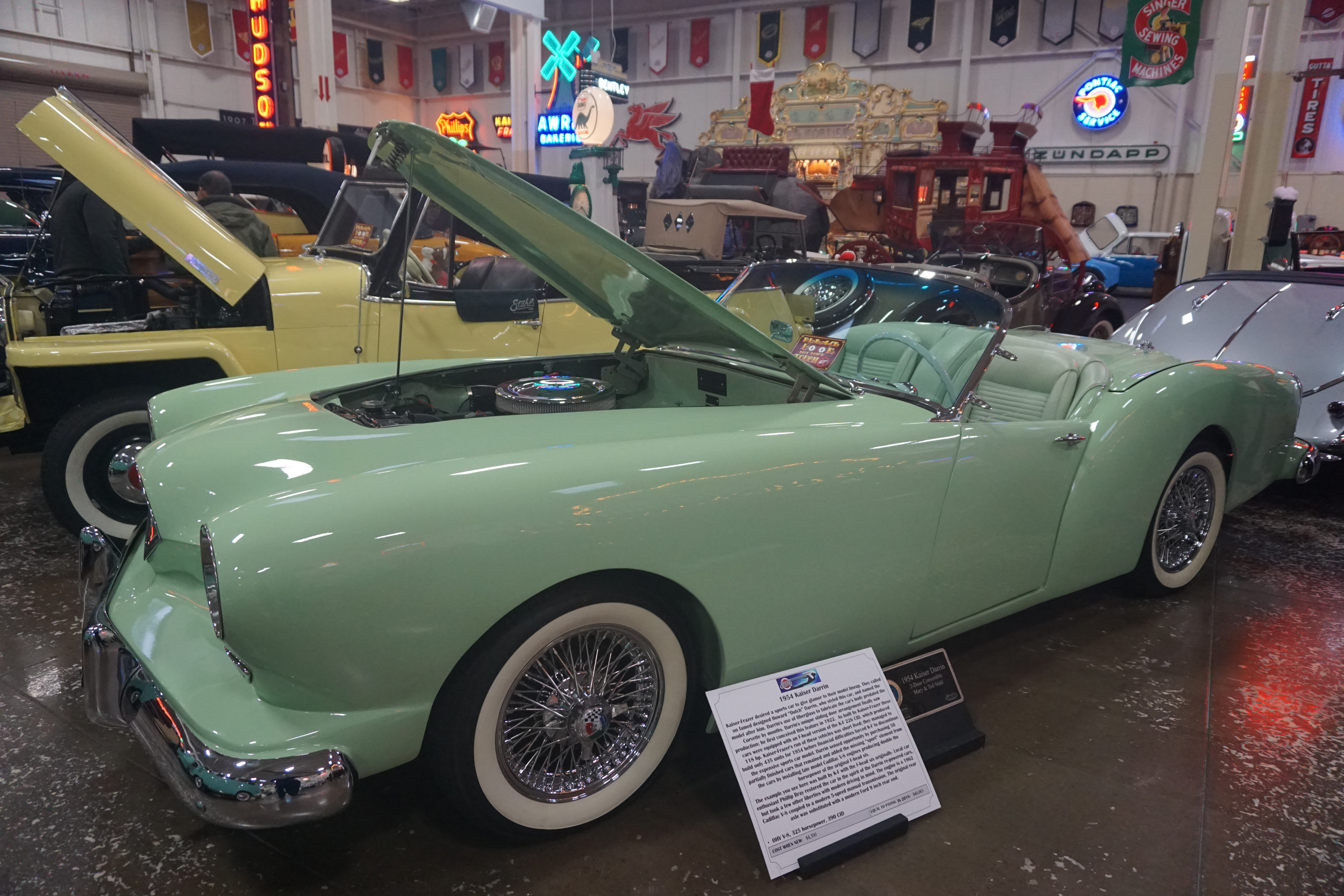
A 1954 Kaiser Darrin on display at Stahls Automotive Collection

Severson maintains that, while conventional wisdom would consider the Kaiser Darrin a marketing failure, it really did not do that badly when compared to its competition in the sports car field. The Nash-Healey, which was also expensive, sold only around 500 vehicles between 1951 and 1954. Allard production was never more than 150 or so a year. Annual sales of fiberglass kit cars such as the Glasspar G2 and Woodill Woodfire were measured in the dozens. Severson adds that while the Corvette was produced in far greater numbers than either the Kaiser Darrin or its foreign rivals, Chevrolet’s greater marketing resources and stronger dealer network did not ensure brisk sales. Hundreds of unsold Corvettes remained at the end of 1954. The model did not become profitable for General Motors, Severson says, until it was equipped with a V8 engine and roll-up windows. With all this in mind, Severson concludes, the fact that Kaiser sold as many Darrins as it did was somewhat remarkable.

Even if Kaiser Motors had been stronger financially or more established in the marketplace, Severson says, the Darrin might not have sold in large numbers. Practical considerations such as a lower price, better performance and effective weatherproofing might have led to higher sales. Even so, Severson continues, the company would likely not have made much money on the car. Had it arrived in showrooms early enough to provide a greater promotional value to Kaiser Motors as a whole, Severson says, this fact might not have proved so crucial. By the time production Darrins arrived, Severson suggests, "Kaiser didn’t need a traffic builder, it needed a miracle."

== General and cited sources ==
- Auto Editors of Consumer Guide, "Kaiser-Darrin", How Stuff Works. Accessed 6 Nov 2013.
- Donneley, Jim, "Howard A. Darrin", Hemmings Classic Car. Accessed 6 Nov 2013.
- Flory, J. Kelly, "1954-Kaiser", American Cars, 1946-1959: Every Model, Year by Year. Accessed 6 Nov 2013.
- McMullen, Jeremy, "1954 Kaiser Darrin news, pictures, and information", conceptcarz from concept to production. Accessed 6 Nov 2013.
- Owen, Richard, "1954 Kaiser-Darrin Convertible", www.supercars.net. Accessed 6 Nov 2013.
- Roth, Frederick J., "Kaiser Darrin". Accessed 6 Nov 2013.
- Schorr, Martyn L., Motion Performance: Tales of a Muscle Car Builder. Accessed 6 Nov 2013.
- Severson, Aaron, "Dressed to Kill: The 1954 Kaiser Darrin", Ate Up with Motor. Accessed 6 Nov 2013.
- Severson, Aaron, "Kaisers Never Retrench: The History of Kaiser-Frazer, Part 1", Ate Up With Motor. Accessed 8 Nov 2013.
- Severson, Aaron, "Kaisers Never Retrench: The History of Kaiser-Frazer, Part 2", Ate Up with Motor. Accessed 8 Nov 2013.
- Zenlea, David, "Collectible Classic: 1954 Kaiser Darrin", Automobile Magazine, September 2012. Accessed 6 Nov 2013.
