= Darrin of Paris =

Defunct American motor vehicle body manufacturer

Darrin of Paris was an American coachbuilding business.

Designer and coachbuilder Howard "Dutch" Darrin (1897-1982) left France and set up a practice in Hollywood at the end of the 1930s and designed special automobile bodies on luxury chassis for Hollywood stars. He also developed an association with the Packard Motor Company and his designs for Packard were produced in relatively short runs by plants sited nearer Packard's own home. Production seems to have ended with the onset of World War II.

== Custom bodies, Paris ==
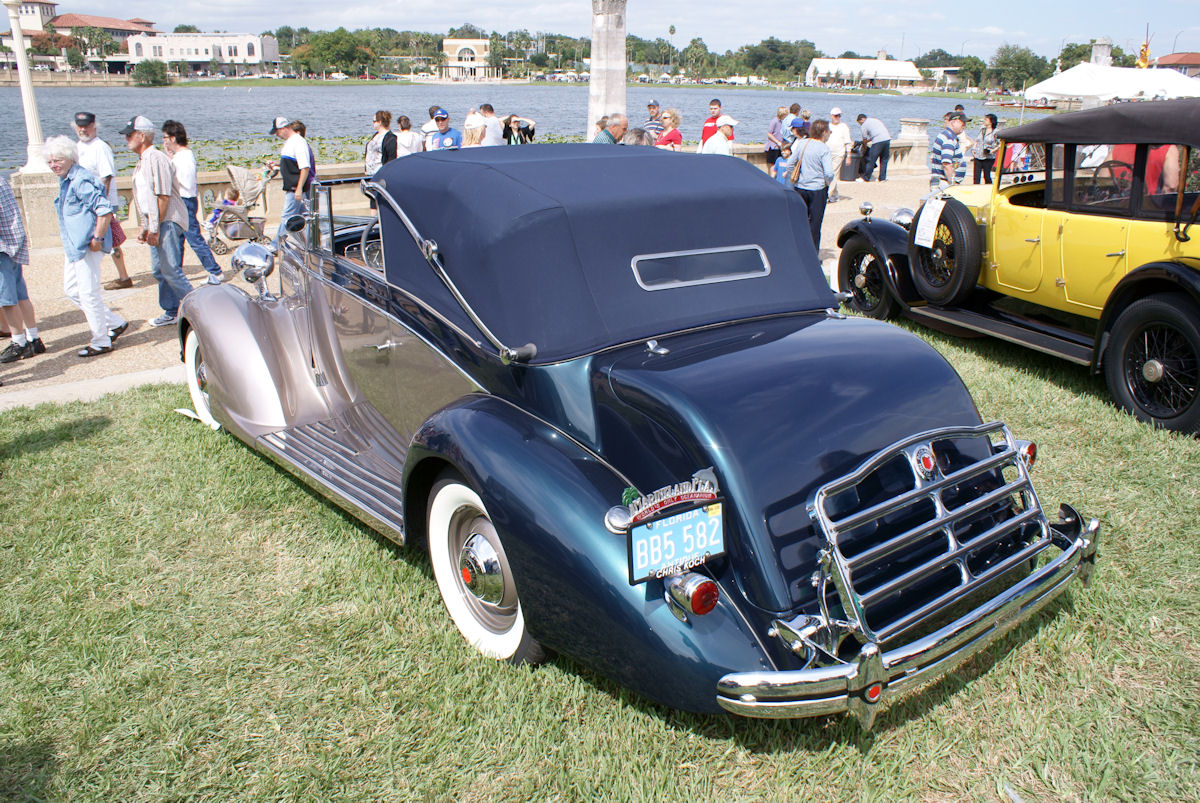
Drophead cabriolet on a 1937 Packard 120 chassis His first Hollywood designs were in the European style

Darrin had been a US pilot serving in France in the last years of World War I when he met fellow countryman Thomas Hibbard. They were employed after the war as designers by Brewster & Co which they left. Hibbard had helped to establish LeBaron and taking Darrin visited France to supervise construction of some LeBaron bodies in Paris.

They then stayed on in Paris and established first their own design practice, then set up their own factory in Paris: Hibbard & Darrin at Puteaux.

Undercapitalised, they were forced to shut down by the financial crisis of 1929 which badly affected their American backer's resources. Hibbard took a design position back home in General Motors. After a second successful partnership in Paris, known as Carrosserie Fernandez et Darrin, Howard Darrin returned home in 1937 and settled in Hollywood.

== Hollywood's Darrin of Paris ==
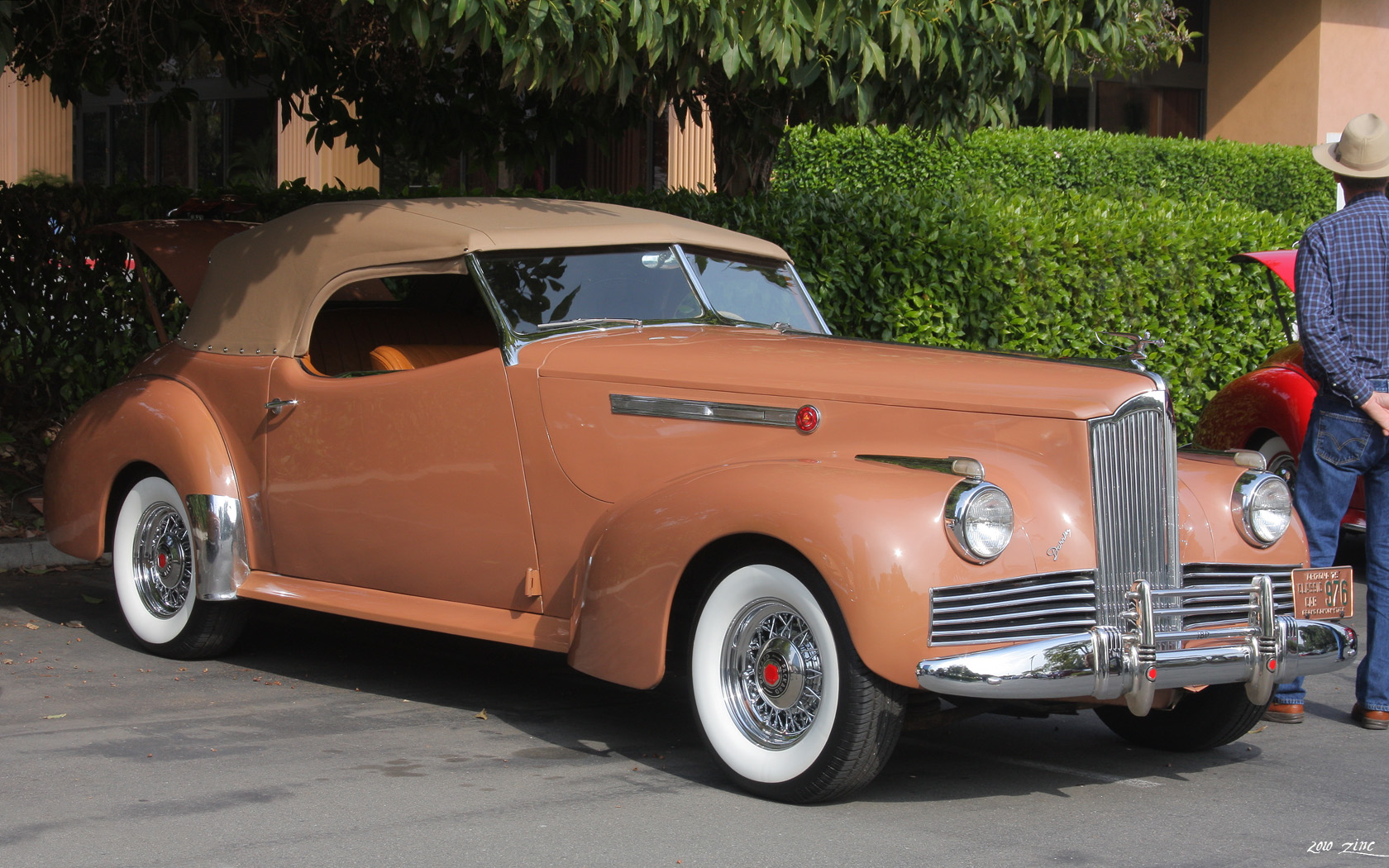
Convertible coupe on a 1942 Packard Clipper chassis

His first Hollywood designs, on a Packard 120 chassis, were in the European style and while they did bring in orders they also brought him to the attention of Packard's management. Building Packards would overstretch his Hollywood workshops so they were built by American Central Manufacturing in Connersville ("Little Detroit"), Indiana. Darrin would travel back and forth between California and Indiana supervising construction. This work was shifted to Hess & Eisenhart in Cincinnati to let American Central Manufacturing Company concentrate on Jeep bodies.

Howard Darrin continued to build special orders in his Hollywood shop. The bodies contracted out were convertible Victorias, four-seaters with a low profile but with wind-down windows in their doors.
