= Briggs Manufacturing Company =

American car manufacturer

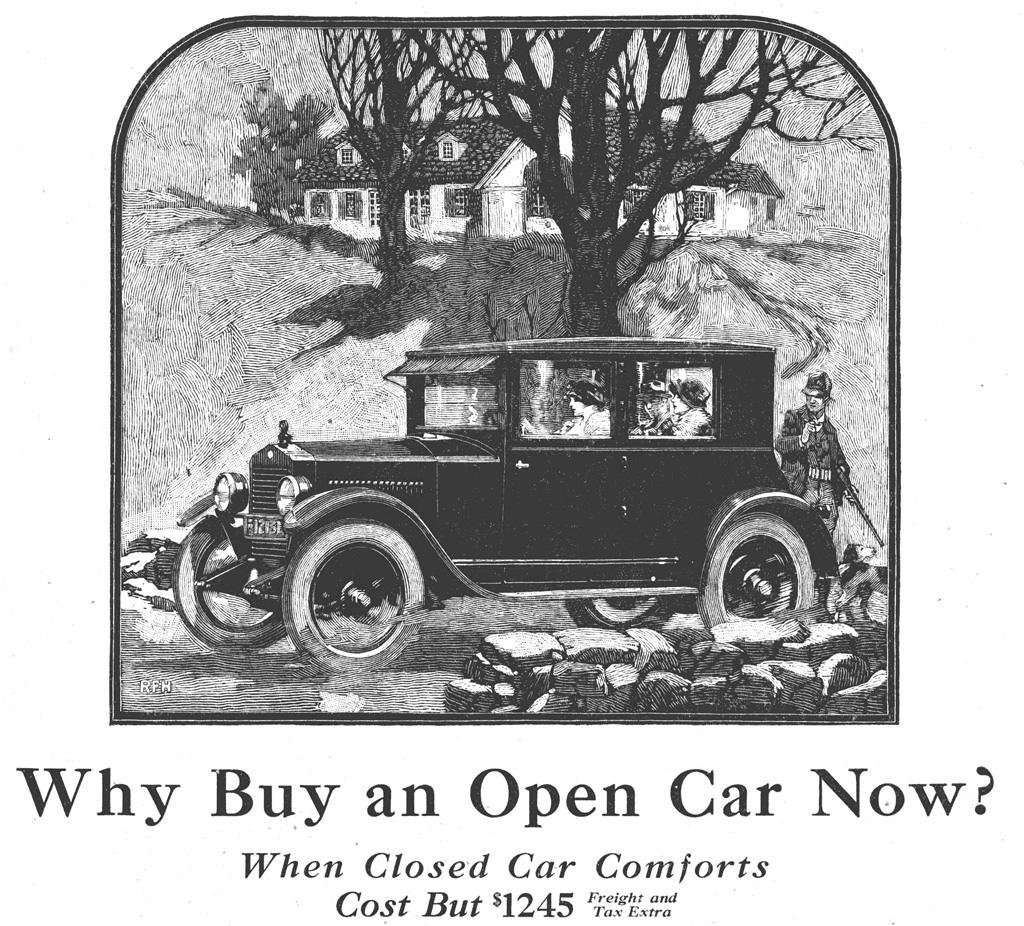
- 1923 Essex coach for $1,245 (equivalent to $23,526 in 2025)
- Industry: Automotive
- Predecessor: B F Everitt Company
- Founded: 1909; 117 years ago
- Founder: Walter Briggs Sr.
- Defunct: 1953
- Fate: Acquisition
- Successor: Chrysler Corporation
- Headquarters: Detroit, Michigan, United States
- Key people: John Tjaarda, chief designer
- Products: Coaches

Briggs Manufacturing was an American, Detroit-based manufacturer of automobile bodies for Ford Motor Company, Chrysler Corporation and other U.S. and European automobile manufacturers.

In 1953, it was bought by Chrysler Corporation without its former Beautyware plumbing division which is now owned by Cerámicas Industriales, South America (CISA).

== History ==
Walter Briggs, by trade an upholsterer of carriages, after experience as a plant superintendent outside the industry joined a Detroit carriage builder and repairer, B F Everitt Company. Everitt had made some automobile bodies for Ransom E Olds and Henry Ford. Walter Briggs was soon in charge of the shops then became vice-president and then president. In 1909 the owners decided to make complete cars and Briggs was able to buy the Everitt coachbuilding business and reorganize it as Briggs Manufacturing Company.

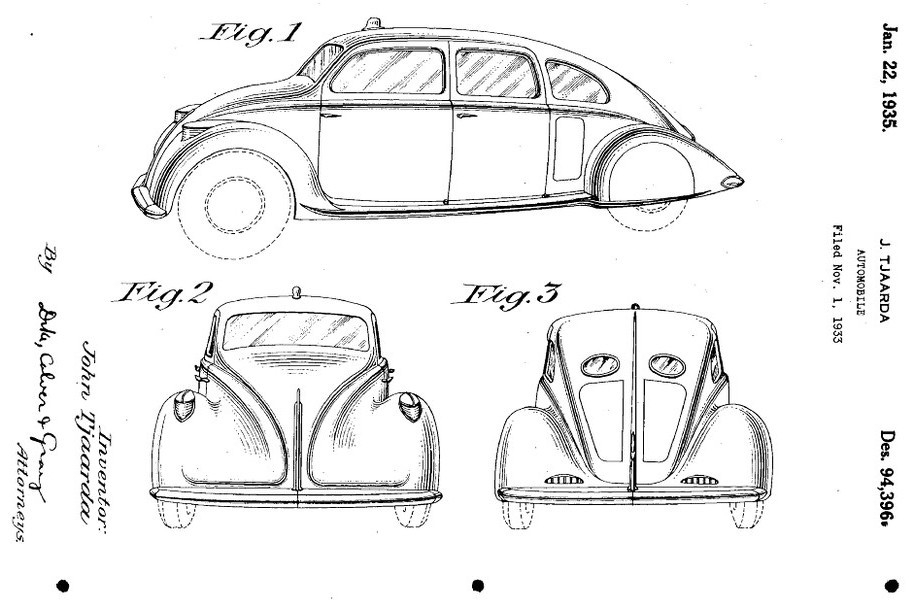
1933 design by John Tjaarda

At this time the new Briggs business provided upholstery for a number of Detroit manufacturers, In 1910 Briggs agreed to supply 10,000 Ford Model T interiors and a close association was formed.

In 1922 Briggs made for Essex a closed car at a price near an open touring car and by 1925 Essex offered buyers the option of an open or closed Briggs bodied car at the same price. As demand for the closed cars expanded more businesses were acquired including competitors supplying to Ford.

During the 1920s Ford and General Motors began to make their own bodies and Briggs became the largest independent.

Other prominent independent builders of automobile bodies included: Murray Body Corporation, C R Wilson Body Company, Edward G Budd Manufacturing Company and Fisher Body Company.

=== LeBaron ===
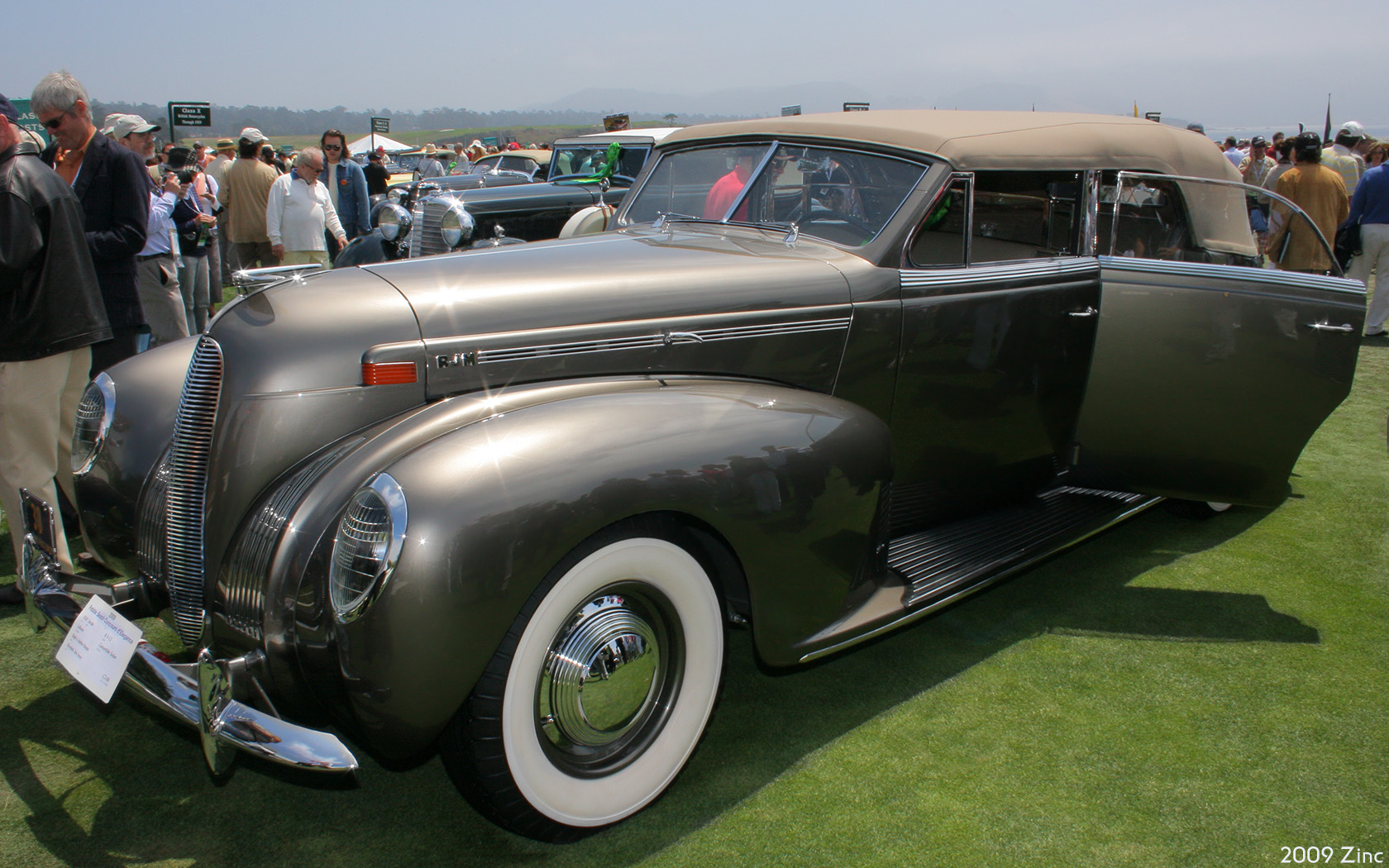
1938 Lincoln V12 by LeBaron and Briggs

LeBaron Carossiers Inc, a New York City custom body builder, was bought in 1926 and activities moved to Detroit and named LeBaron Studios. A New York design office remained at 724 Fifth Avenue. The studio's first influence was on design of the Briggs-built open bodies for the Ford Model A. By that time Briggs' Detroit plants were at Harper Avenue, Mack Avenue, Meldrum Avenue and Vernor Highway. A fire at Harper Avenue caused Briggs to lease the Model T plant at Highland Park in which they made many bodies for Chrysler. Later Briggs leased space in Ford's Cleveland, Ohio plant. LeBaron designers were responsible for the 1933 Ford V8 body and the Lincoln Zephyr.

LeBaron featured as a Chrysler model name on some of Chrysler's Imperials until near the end of the 20th century.

=== Ford ===
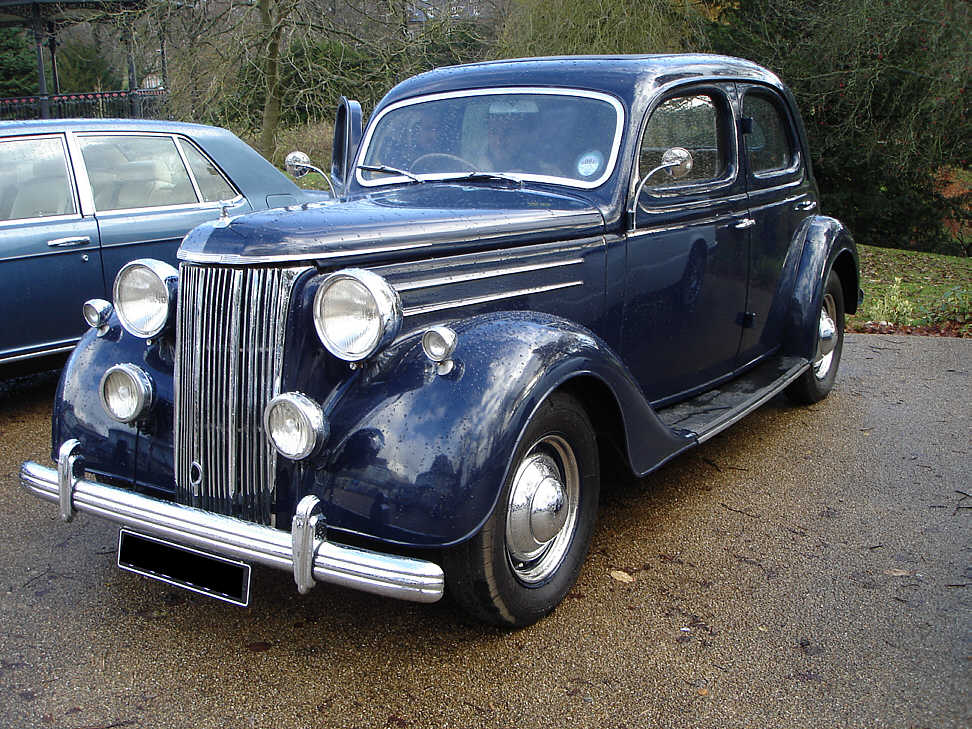
Ford V8 Pilot with body by Briggs Dagenham

Ford obtained and retained access to Briggs' records and controlled pricing of products supplied to Ford and also supply of raw materials to Briggs. Briggs followed Ford to the United Kingdom setting up a plant for their Briggs Motor Bodies Limited in Dagenham when British Ford built there. Ownership was moved to an English subsidiary in 1935 retaining a 60 per cent shareholding. Another plant was set up in Doncaster, England after World War II to build bodies for other brands.

Briggs Detroit plants (supplying Ford) were the centers of strike action by United Auto Workers in 1933 and 1937 where UAW was successful.

Other well-known brands that fitted Briggs' bodies were: Lincoln, Chrysler, Packard, Hudson, Pierce Arrow, Tucker, and Marmon

== Inhouse ==
The Great Depression caused many customers to bring many more operations under their direct control. Briggs had provided two-thirds of Ford's bought-in bodies in 1936 but the share had fallen to just over a quarter by 1939 and those went to Lincoln and Mercury. Ford, Chrysler, Packard and Hudson set up their own in-house design departments and LeBaron lost importance for Briggs.

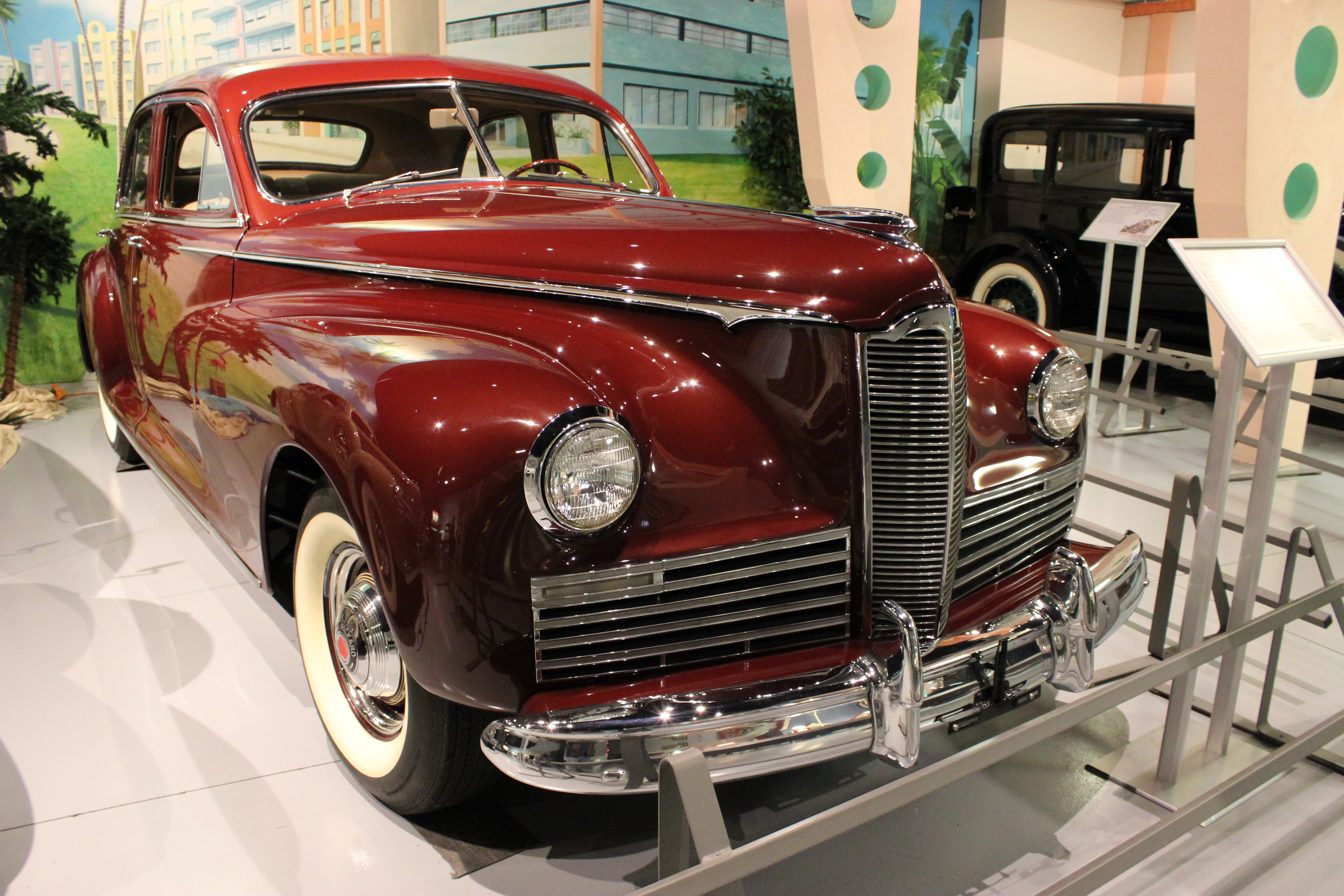
1941 Packard Clipper

Beginning with the all-new 1941 Clipper all Packard bodies were built by Briggs.

=== World War II ===
A workforce of over 36,000 built aircraft gun-turrets, doors, wing components, bomb doors, heavy and medium tank hulls, trucks and ambulance bodies.

== Sale to Chrysler ==
Walter Briggs died in January 1952 and in December 1953 Chrysler Corporation bought Briggs' entire US body building operation; Chrysler had announced the deal—awaiting approval of its stockholders—on 23 October. There were twelve plants, ten in Detroit, and another two in Youngstown, Ohio and Evansville, Indiana. The Packard body plant was leased to Packard. Dagenham and Trafford Park were sold to Ford Motor Company Limited and customer Jowett ended production and went out of business.

== Beautyware ==
A new product appeared in 1933. Briggs engineers had worked out how to replace the standard heavy cast iron bathtub. They used their expertise in deep draw metal stamping and the machinery for making car fenders. The new bathtub was stackable and about one-quarter of the weight of the cast iron product. The Briggs family kept Beautyware and did not sell it to Chrysler in 1953. Bought by Cerámicas Industriales, South America (CISA) in 1997 it is now directed from Charleston South Carolina. Briggs Plumbing Products operates plants throughout the Americas.

== Europe ==
Briggs Bodies Limited set up works at Dagenham to manufacture steel bodies for cars and trucks and steel-stampings for Ford Motor Company Limited. Work started in May 1930 and production began in 1932. By July 1935 it had 4,500 employees and included these customers beside Ford, Austin, Chrysler, Riley, Standard and others. In August 1935 the business of Briggs Bodies was transferred to Briggs Motor Bodies Limited in order to raise capital in England. A factory was opened in Balby Carr, Doncaster in 1941, another in Southampton in 1949.

In 1953 Ford of Britain bought Detroit's controlling share of Briggs Motor Bodies Limited. The Briggs factory at Doncaster was surplus to Ford's requirements and it was sold to Fisher and Ludlow. Fisher and Ludlow itself was quickly swallowed up by the newly created British Motor Corporation, .
