= Hibbard & Darrin =

French coachbuilding company

Carrosserie Hibbard et Darrin was a French coachbuilder located 12 Rue de Berri in Paris, just off the Champs-Élysées. Owned by two Americans, Hibbard and Darrin, it built bodies for various luxury car chassis, including Rolls-Royce, Duesenberg and Minerva.

== Hibbard and Dietrich LeBaron ==
Two American designers, Thomas L. Hibbard (1898-1982) and Raymond H. Dietrich, had met while working for Brewster. Tired of the corporate environment, they started freelance work in their spare time. When William H Brewster discovered this, he fired Dietrich. Hibbard left too. They formed the new company LeBaron after a family friend. LeBaron did not build car bodies, it sold car designs.

== Hibbard et Darrin ==
Fellow designer Howard "Dutch" Darrin (1897-1982) met Tom Hibbard in 1923, who had had left LeBaron, and they founded the company Hibbard & Darrin. The company designed innovative styled bodies for many of Europe's most prestigious car makers but the partnership ended in 1931 when Hibbard returned to the USA to take up a position in General Motors' design department.

== Fernandez et Darrin ==
Darrin remained in France and formed the new company Fernandez and Darrin with the wealthy Argentina-born French banker J. Fernandez. Fernandez owned a shop in Boulogne-sur-Seine (J. Fernandez et Cie since 1926-1927) and a showroom on the Champs-Élysées. The company bought its own chassis, allowing the company to keep an inventory of ready to sell automobiles. Making excessively luxurious cars, the shop's production rate averaged 10 cars built per month. The production cost was so high that the company made only a modest profit. Fernandez et Darrin made the 1933 Duesenberg convertible for Greta Garbo. Anthony Gustav de Rothschild commissioned the 1935 Hispano-Suiza H6 Fernandez & Darrin Coupe Chauffeur limousine.

In 1934, the showroom was moved from the Champs-Élysées to the rue du Faubourg Saint-Honoré. The company's top customer was the rich Argentinean heir Martin Máximo Pablo de Alzaga Unzue ("Macoco"), who bought 26 models according to Darrin.

== U.S. - "Darrin of Paris" ==
Darrin returned to the United States in 1937 to set up his own Darrin of Paris on Sunset Boulevard, Hollywood managing to convince prospective customers he was a Frenchman.

Howard "Dutch" Darrin designed cars for Kaiser and Studebaker. With Bill Tritt he designed the Kaiser Darrin sports car. For Studebaker, renamed Studebaker Packard after their merger, he designed cars that were never produced, but can be seen at the Studebaker National Museum in South Bend, Indiana. With his sons, he designed some replica cars that were sold in kit form.

== Gallery ==
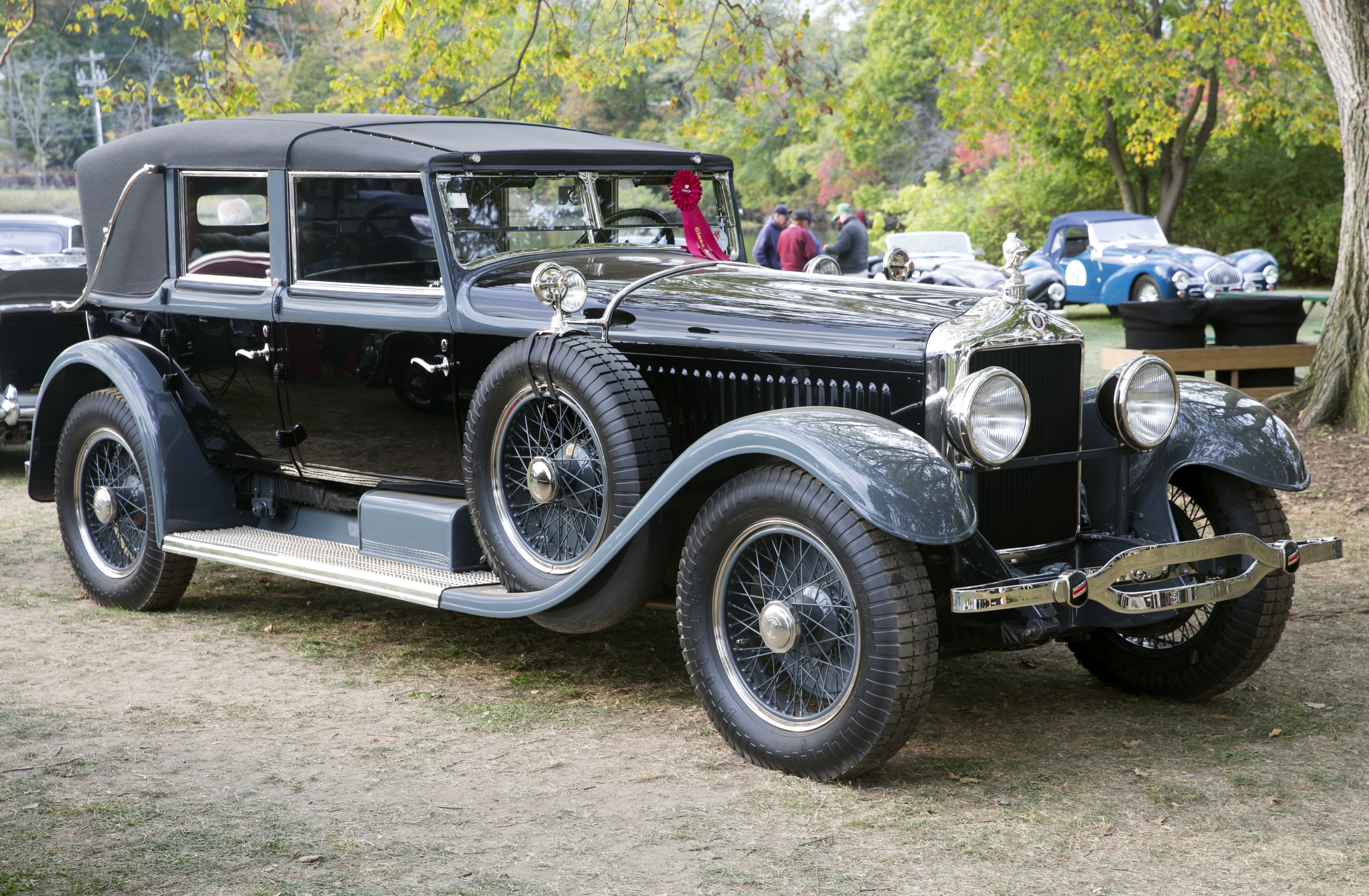
1928 Minerva Type F Transformable Town Car by Hibbard & Darrin

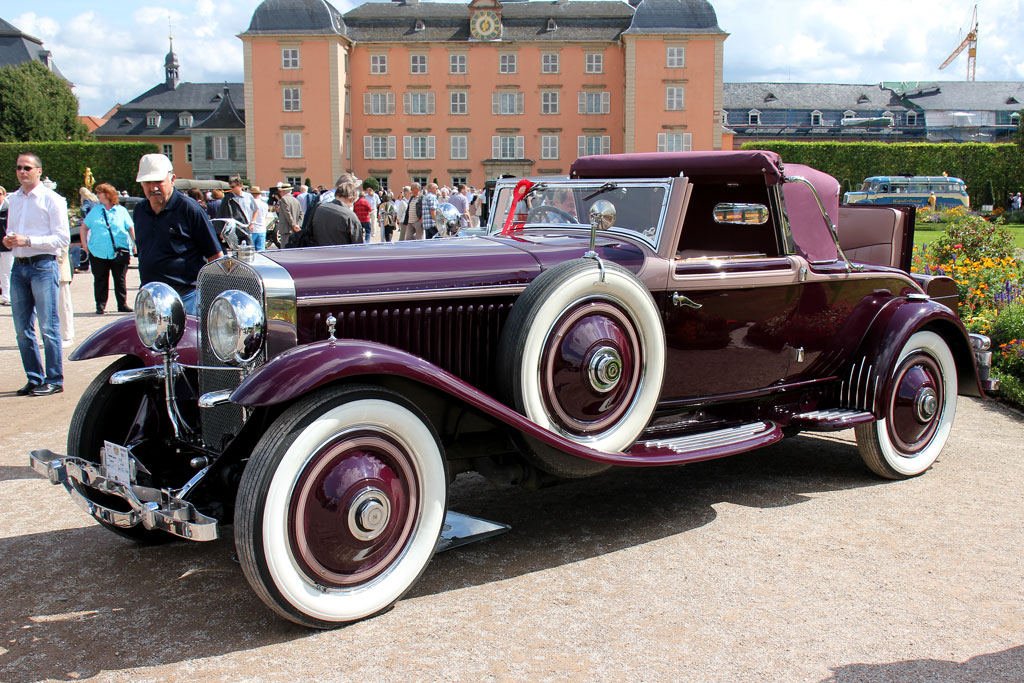
1928 Hispano-Suiza H6B by Hibbard & Darrin

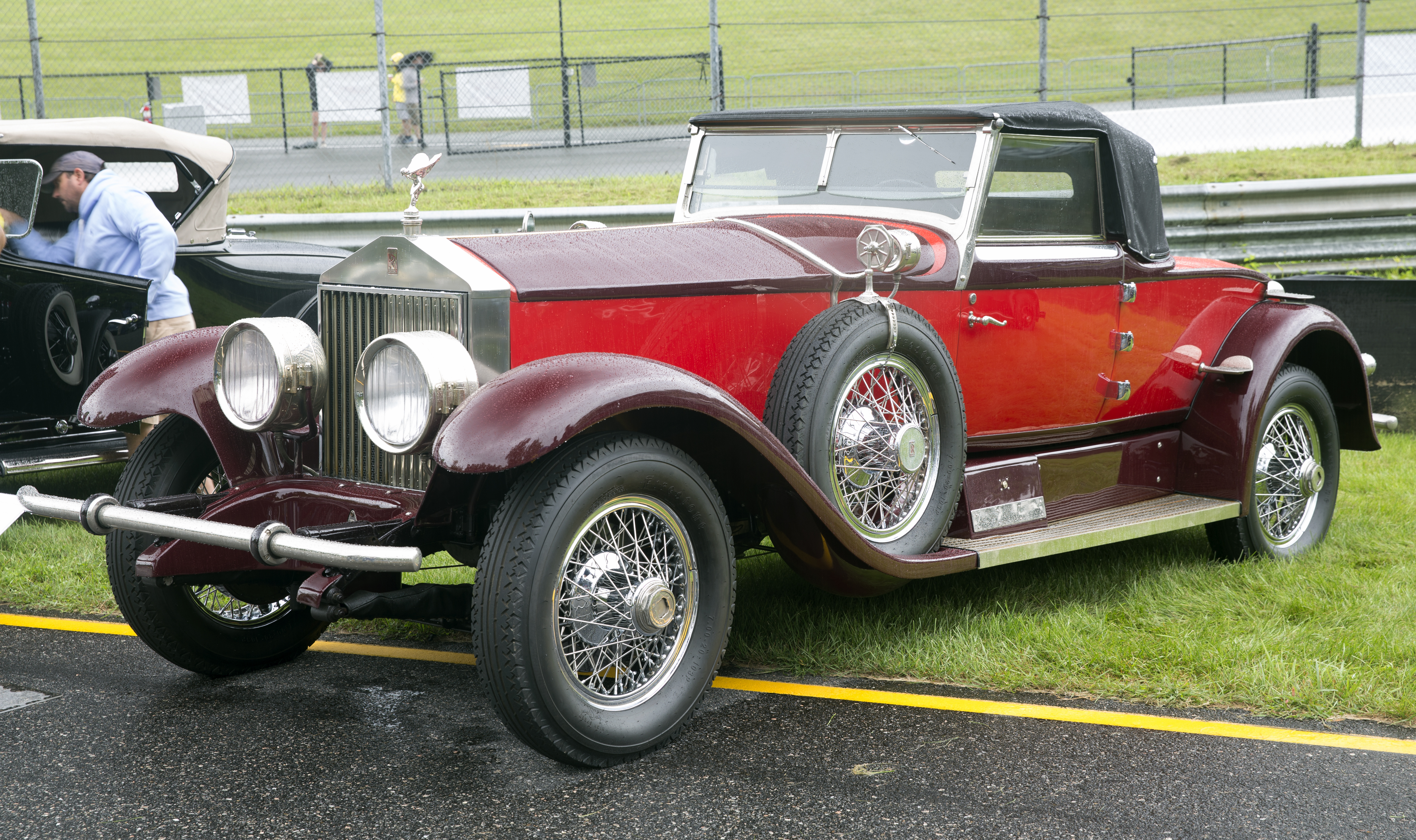
1928 Rolls-Royce Springfield Phantom I Special Roadster by Hibbard & Darrin

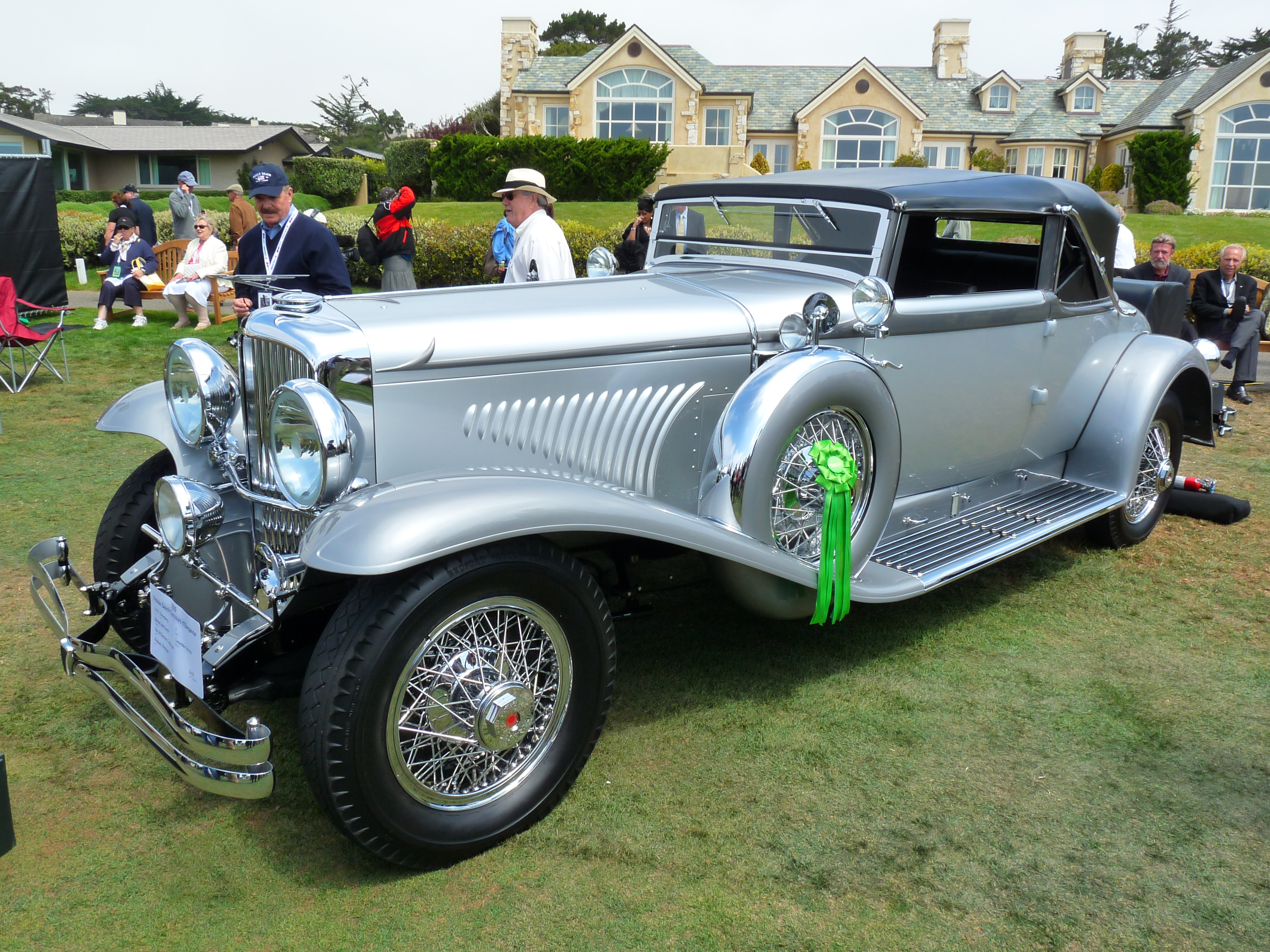
1930 Duesenberg Model J by Hibbard & Darrin

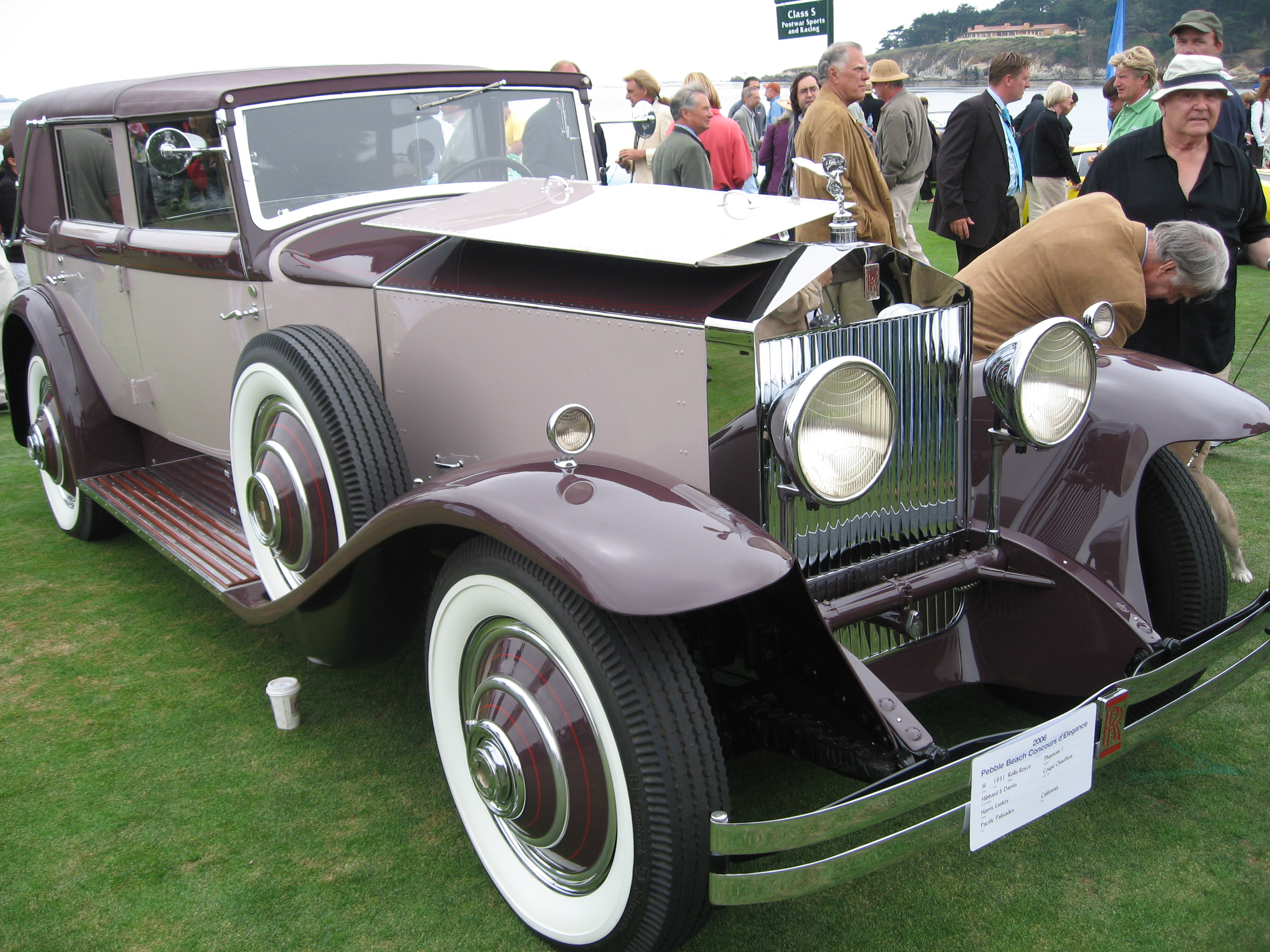
1931 Rolls-Royce Phantom I by Hibbard & Darrin
