= John Tjaarda =

American car designer

- Born: Joop Tjaarda von Starkenburg; 4 February 1897; Arnhem, Netherlands
- Died: 20 March 1962 (aged 65); California, United States
- Spouse: Irene Thompson Tjaarda
- Children: Tom Tjaarda; Elizabeth Thompson Tjaarda
- Engineering career
- Discipline: Car designer
- Projects: Lincoln-Zephyr

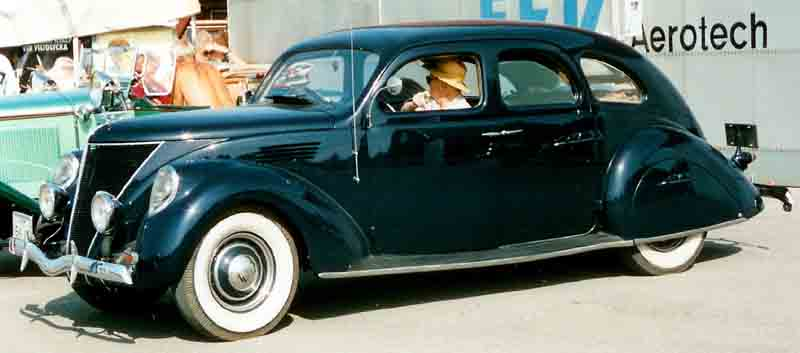
John Tjaarda originated the basic design of what would become the 1936 Lincoln Zephyr

Joop "Jan" Tjaarda van Starkenburg (4 February 1897–20 March 1962), later known as John Tjaarda van Sterkenburg, was a Dutch product and automotive designer and stylist in the United States.

Tjaarda was born in 1897 in Arnhem, as the son of Henriette Elisabeth Thieme and the physician Johannes Jan Tjaarda. Tjaarda trained in aeronautical design in the United Kingdom and later served as a pilot in the Dutch Air Force. After emigrating to the United States in 1923, he changed his name to John and worked in custom coachbuilding in Hollywood. Around 1926, Tjaarda was hired to design bodies by coachbuilders Locke and Company. The best-known of their factory customs was a two-door phaeton called the Touralette, designed earlier by Tjaarda for himself, which Chrysler offered on their L-80 Imperial chassis in 1927–1928. Tjaarda also worked for a while with the original GM Art and Colour Section under famous designer Harley Earl.

During the 1920s, he worked on a series of streamlined monocoque designs, known as the "Sterkenburg series", before joining the Briggs Manufacturing Company as chief of body design. There he developed a concept car for the Ford Motor Company to be shown at the Century of Progress Exhibition (1933–1934) in Chicago. Known as the "Briggs Dream Car", this was a streamlined rear-engined design, based on his previous work. Re-engineered as a front-engined car, this design was developed into the 1936 Lincoln-Zephyr.

Tjaarda also designed an exhibition "Kitchen of Tomorrow" for Briggs in 1934.

Tjaarda's son, Tom Tjaarda, also became an automotive designer, working mainly in Italy.

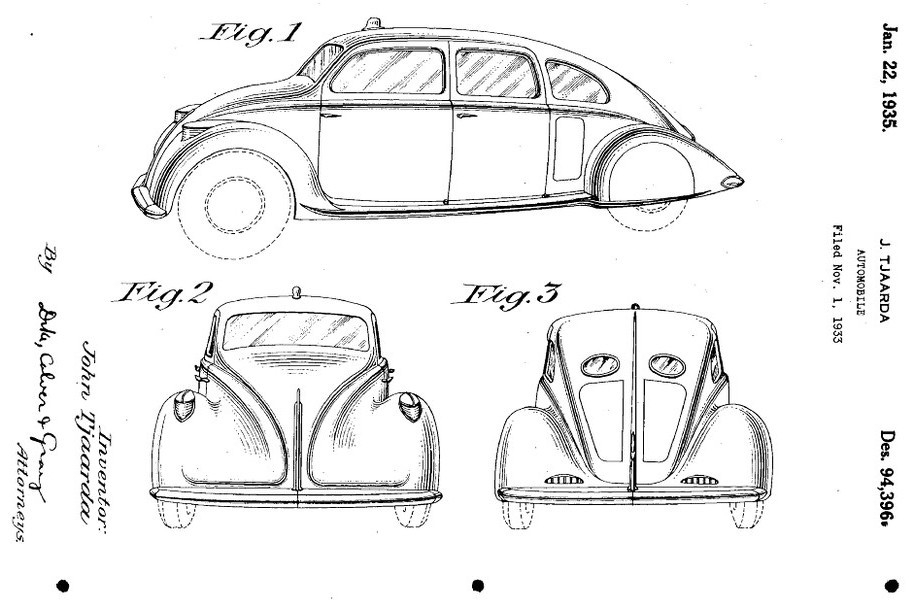
John Tjaarda's rear engine Briggs show car from 1933, patent drawings
