= LeBaron Incorporated =

American design business

Coordinates: 42.3840732°N 82.9788219°W

LeBaron Inc.
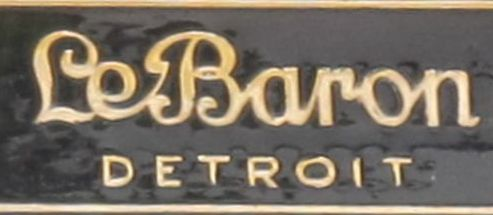
- Industry: Automotive
- Founded: 1920, United States
- Founders: Raymond Dietrich & Thomas Hibbard
- Fate: Purchased by Briggs Manufacturing Company in 1926; Incorporated into Chrysler Corporation in 1953
- Headquarters: New York, U.S.
- Products: Custom bodied cars
- Services: Auto body design, Coachbuilding

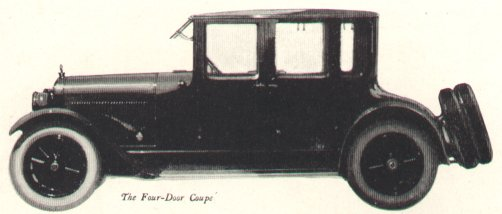
1921 Lafayette four-door coupe, body designed by LeBaron

LeBaron Incorporated (originally LeBaron, Carrossiers Inc.) was an American design business from 1920 and also a coachbuilder from 1924 until 1953.

LeBaron was one of the many prominent coachbuilders in the 1920s to provide bodies for luxury cars. Until World War II most of the great prestige automakers like Duesenberg or Packard would readily supply only a running chassis which wealthy buyers would have fitted with custom bodywork. Automakers like Rolls-Royce and Hispano-Suiza only supplied a rolling chassis.

LeBaron Incorporated eventually became part of Chrysler Corporation.

== LeBaron, Carrossiers Inc ==
LeBaron, Carrossiers Inc. free-lance design consultants was founded in New York City in 1920 by American designers Raymond H. Dietrich (1894-1980) and Thomas L. Hibbard (1898-1982) who had met while working for Brewster & Co. Dietrich and Hibbard remained among the Brewster personnel so they invented a new name LeBaron, Carrossiers from a list of French words that could be easily pronounced but still sounded impressive. Within twelve months Brewster learned what they were doing and ended their Brewster & Co business relationship. They found more work and Hibbard offered the LeBaron administrative jobs to his friend, Ralph Roberts, who had just gotten his Bachelor of Science degree from Dartmouth College. Most design work came to LeBaron through dealers.

=== Hibbard & Darrin ===
Hibbard met fellow designer, Howard A. "Dutch" Darrin (1897-1982) in 1923. Hibbard and Darrin decided to go to Paris, initially to try to sell LeBaron designs where manufacturing costs were lower but once in view of the opportunities decided to set up their own business in Paris and founded Hibbard & Darrin. Hibbard resigned from LeBaron in 1923.

== LeBaron Inc. ==
Dietrich and Roberts continued operating LeBaron with a new illustrator, veteran Roland L. Stickney. LeBaron took over the Blue Ribbon and Bridgeport Body companies thus becoming body builders as well as designers and changed name to LeBaron Inc.

=== Dietrich Inc. ===
Dietrich received a lucrative offer from Murray Corporation, one of Ford's and Lincoln's main body builders, in 1925 and resigned from LeBaron to start Dietrich, Inc. With both founders gone, LeBaron could have been in trouble. But Roberts continued to run the company and orders kept coming in. Walter O. Briggs began talks with Roberts in 1926 to buy LeBaron and move it to Detroit, setting up operations at Mack Avenue Stamping (Old Mack Factory).

== Briggs Manufacturing ==
LeBaron was purchased by Briggs Manufacturing Company of Detroit in 1926 and operated as a subsidiary. Briggs was already supplying bodies to nearby Chrysler, Essex, Ford, Hudson, and Overland. As a Briggs subsidiary, LeBaron handled special custom work, provided design ideas for the main business, and supplied exquisite custom bodies for various car companies such as Chrysler's luxury Imperial line, Duesenberg, Packard, and Cadillac. In 1932, for example, they built 28 Imperial Custom Convertible Coupes, Chrysler's top model, which rode a 146-inch wheelbase and used a 384.8 cubic-inch straight-8 engine.

Thomas L. Hibbard became design director at Ford in 1947. Raymond H. Dietrich was hired by Chrysler in 1932 to become the first official Chrysler stylist.

Briggs Manufacturing was purchased by Chrysler in December 1953.

== Gallery ==
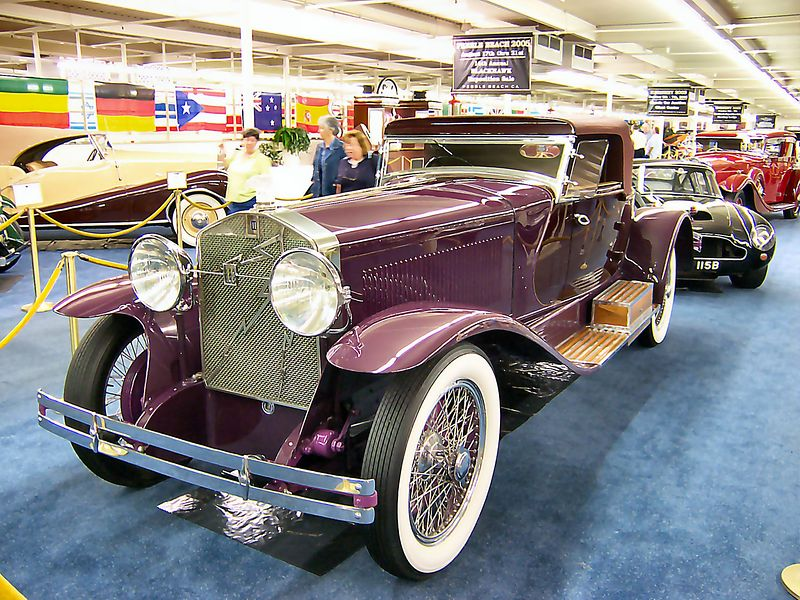
Isotta Fraschini 1928

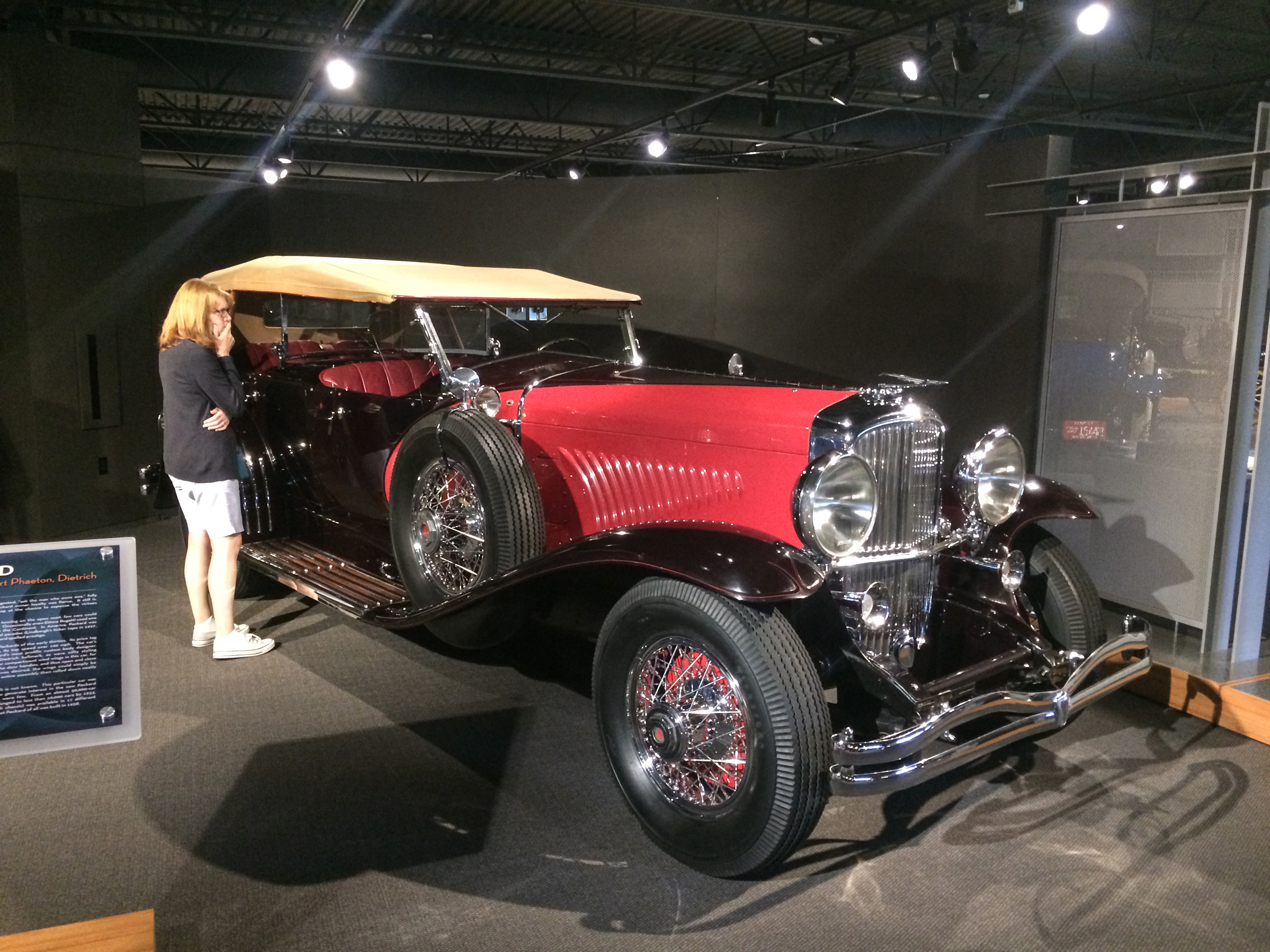
Duesenberg 1930

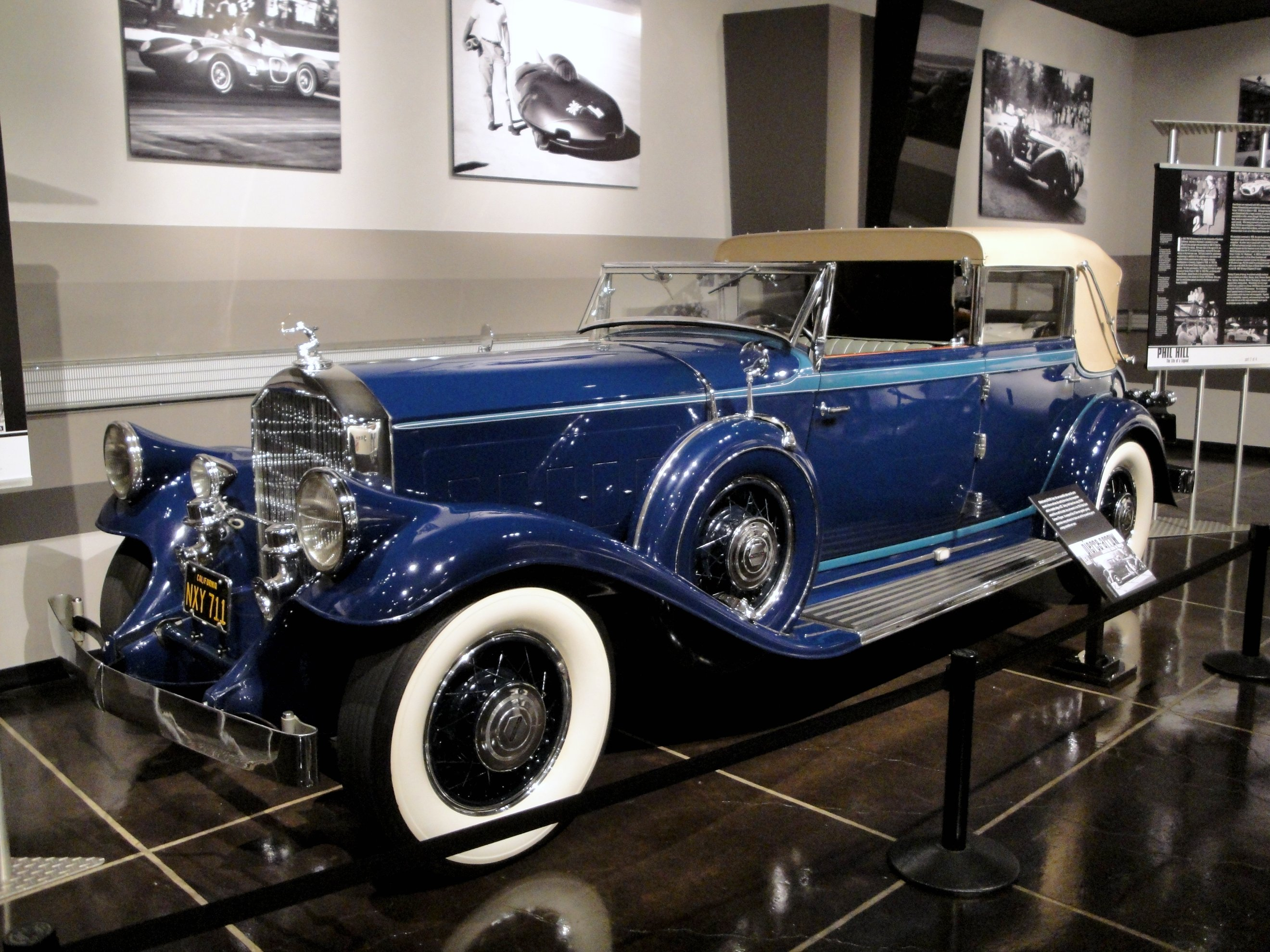
Pierce-Arrow 1931

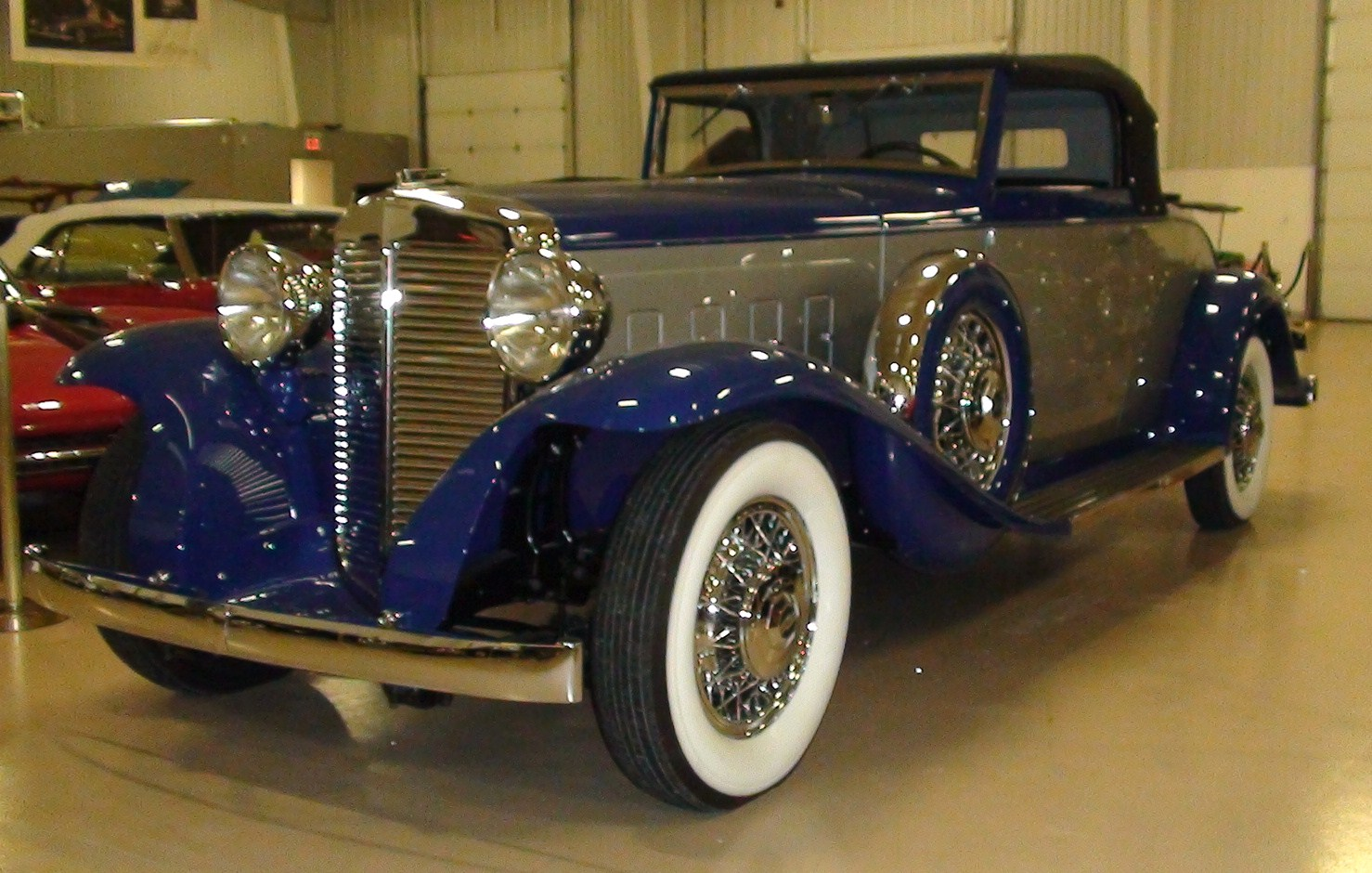
Marmon 1932

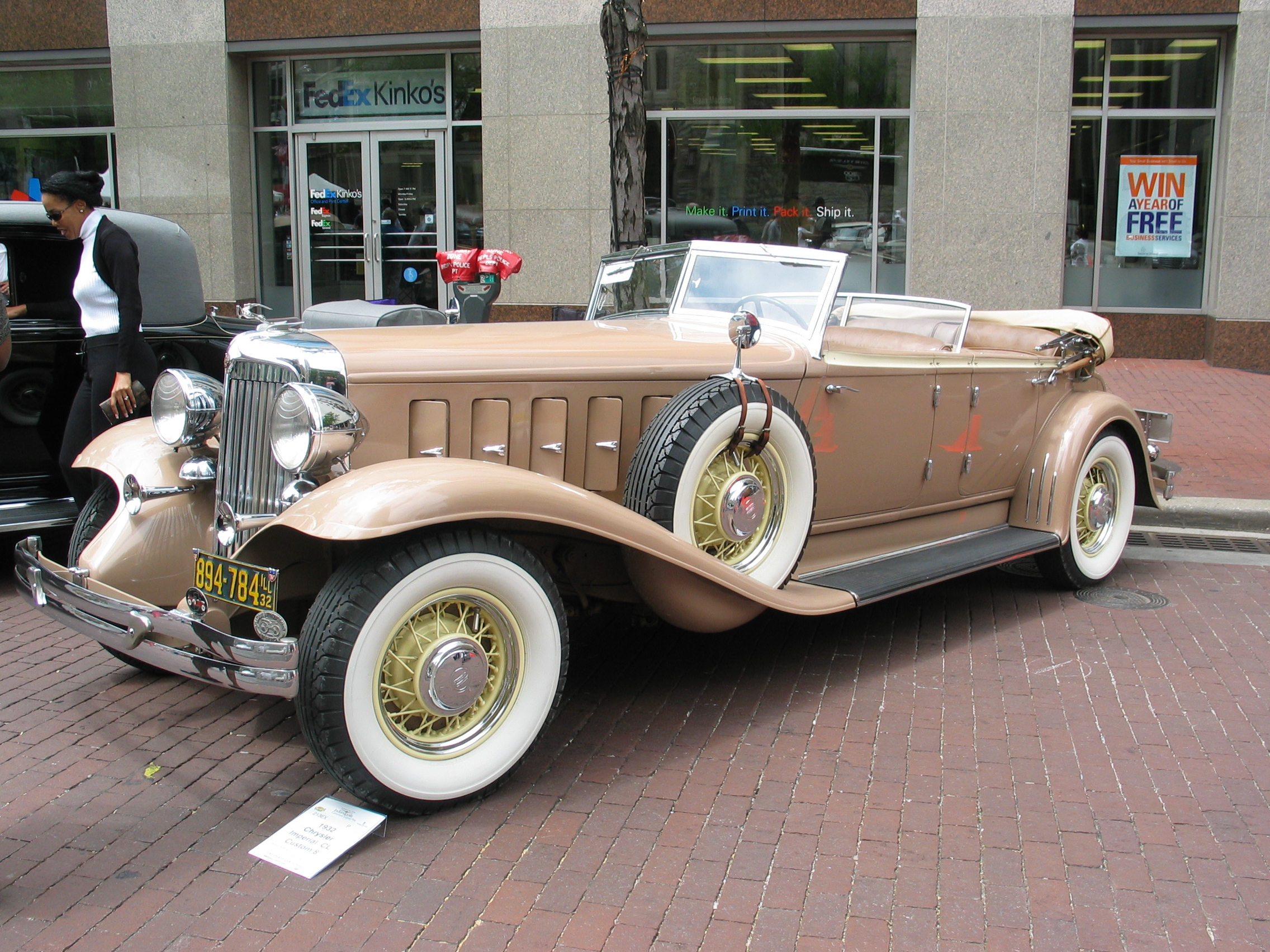
Chrysler Imperial CH 1932

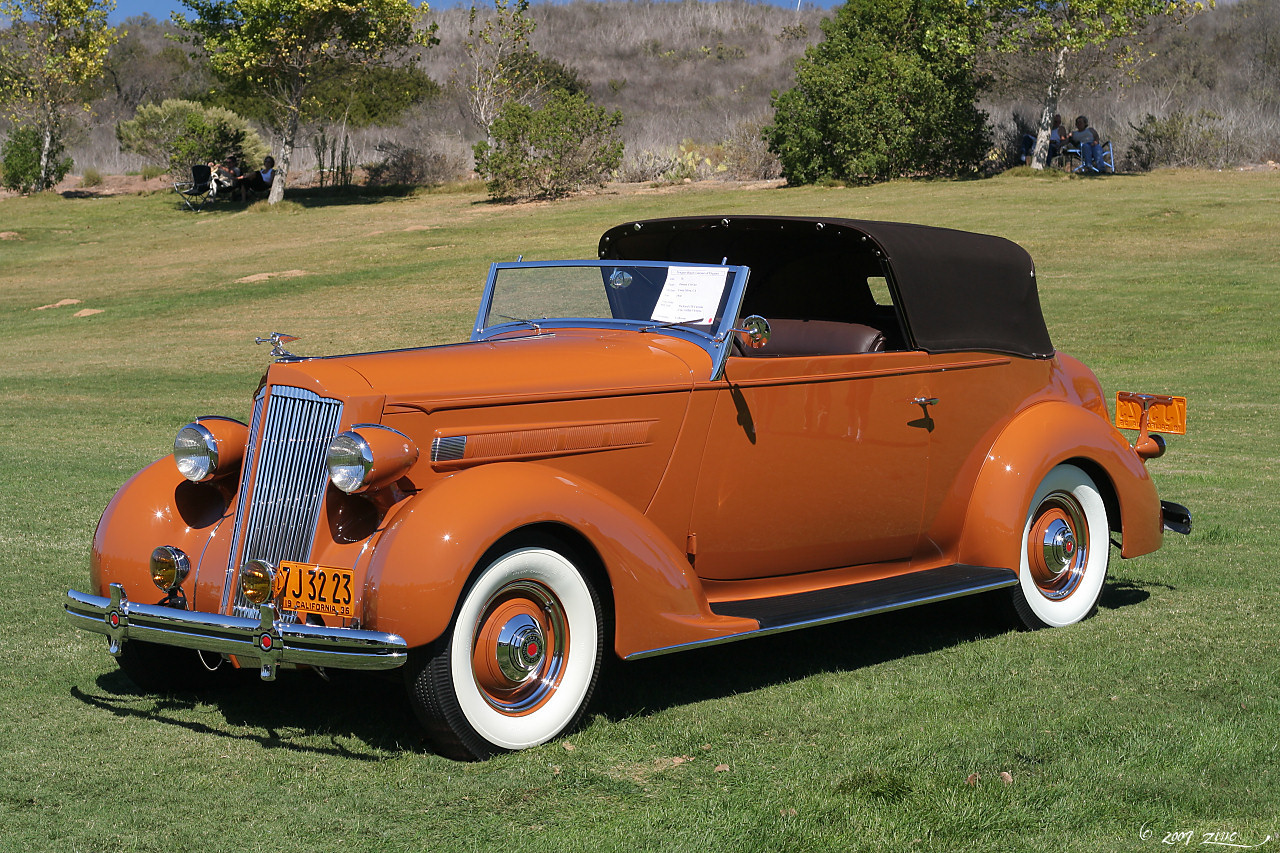
Packard 1936

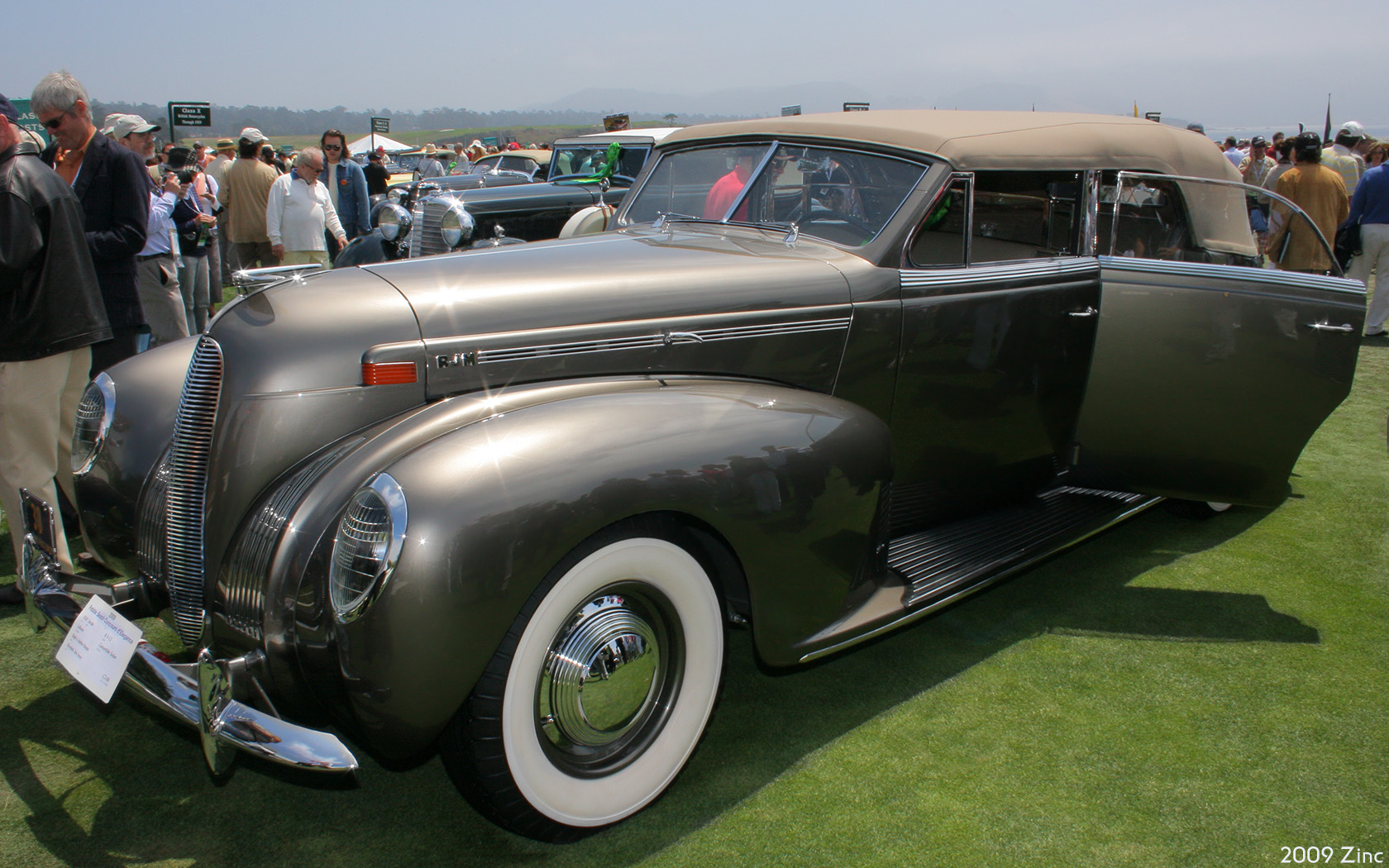
Lincoln 1938

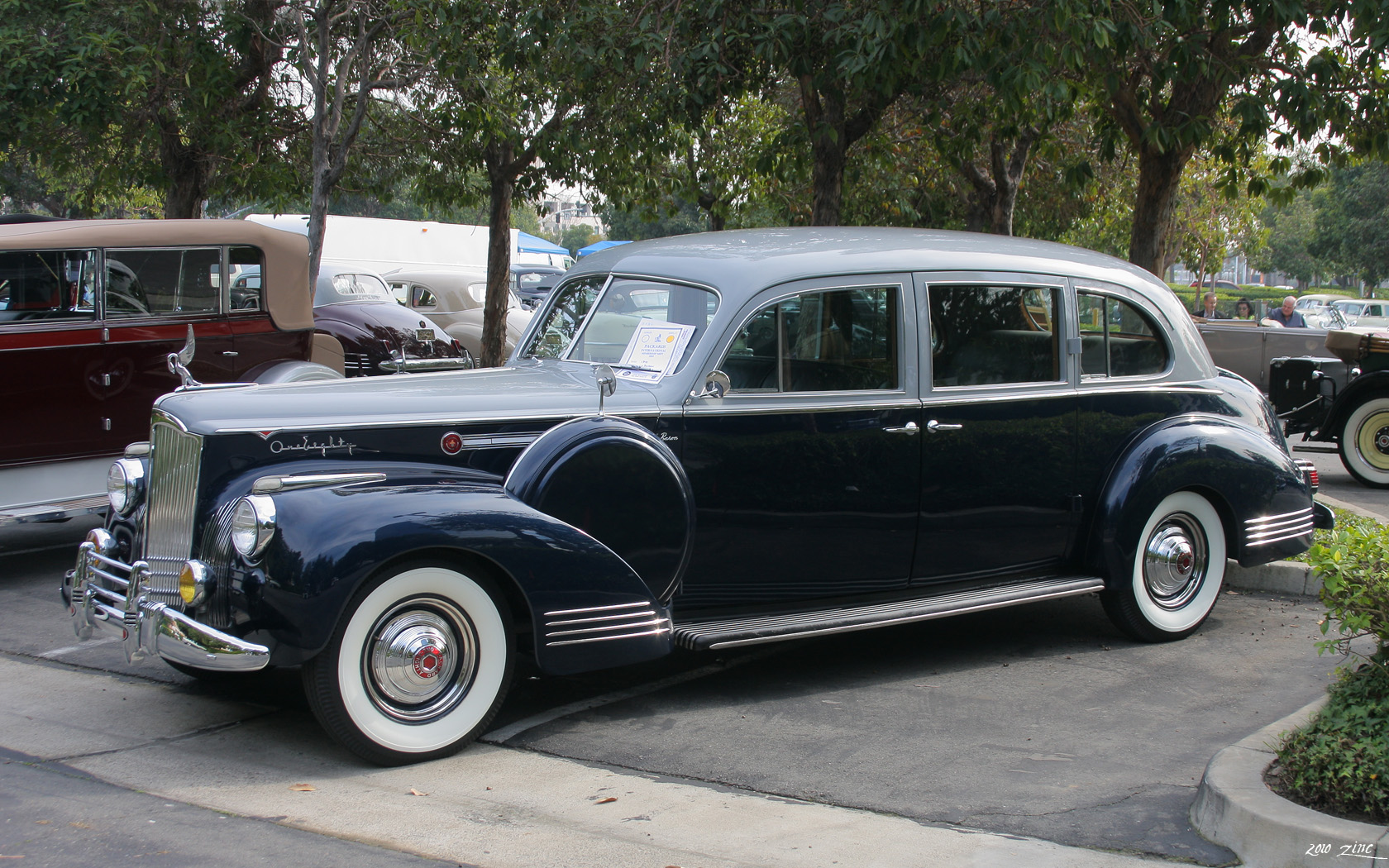
Packard 1941

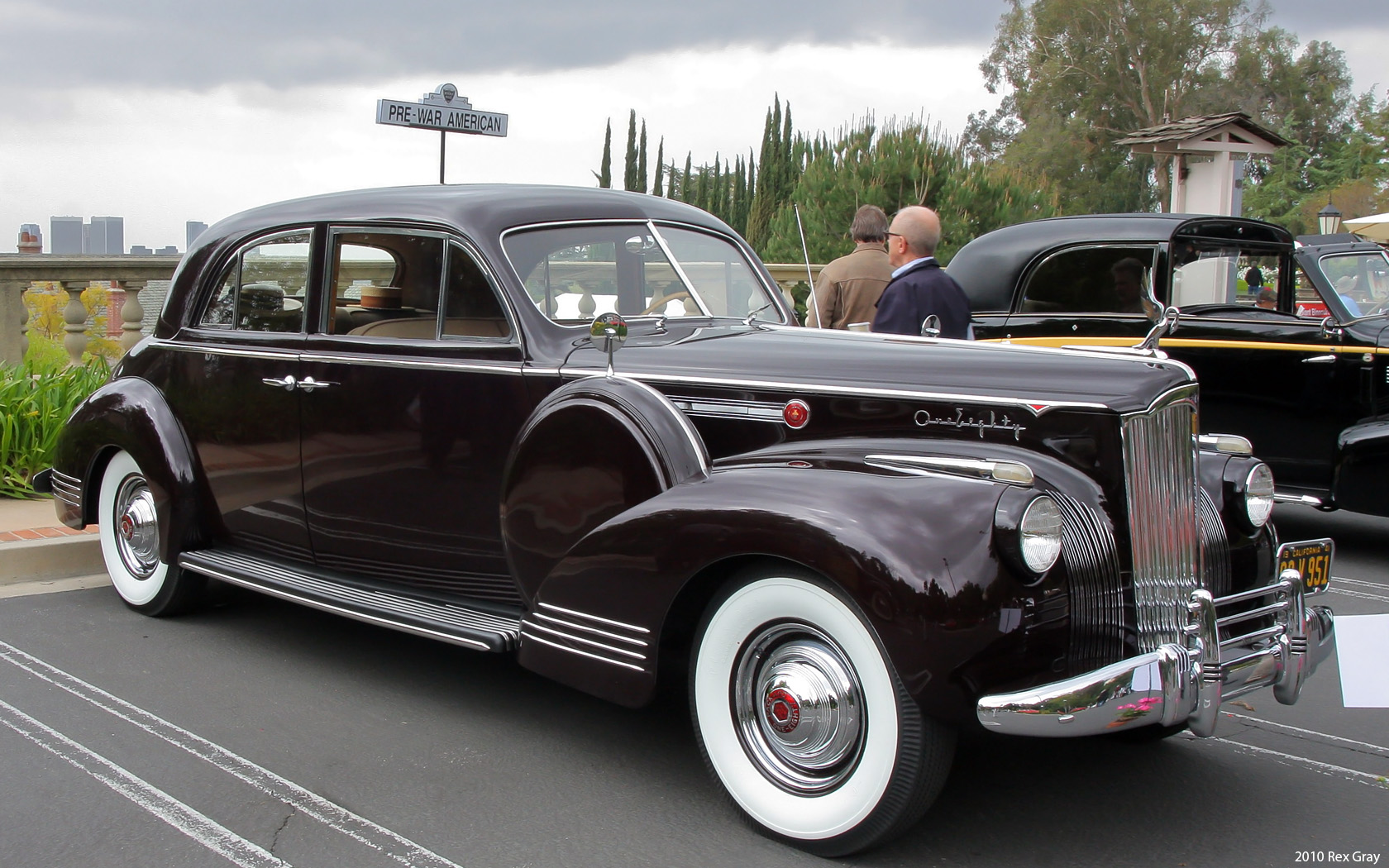
Packard 1941

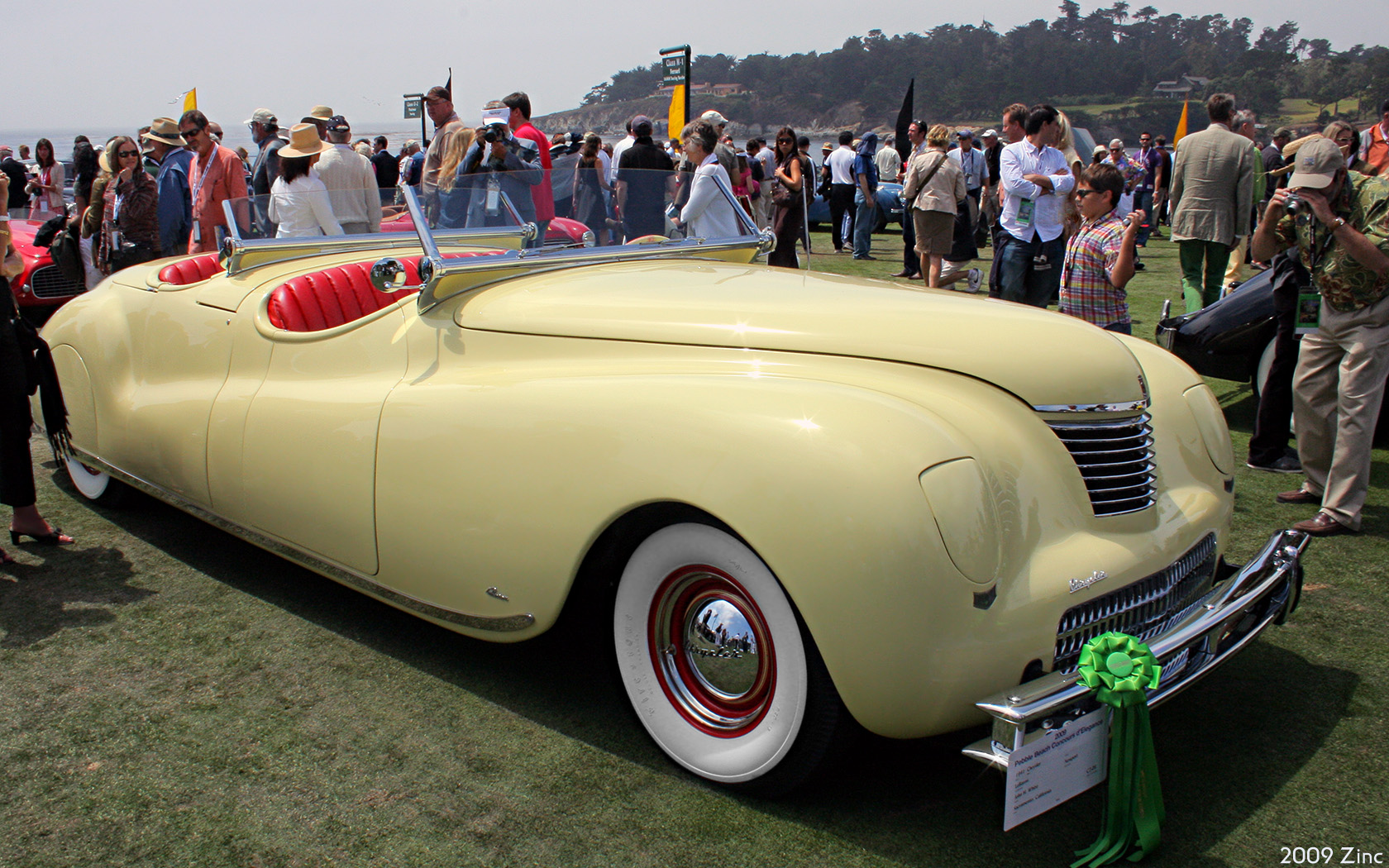
Chrysler Newport 1941

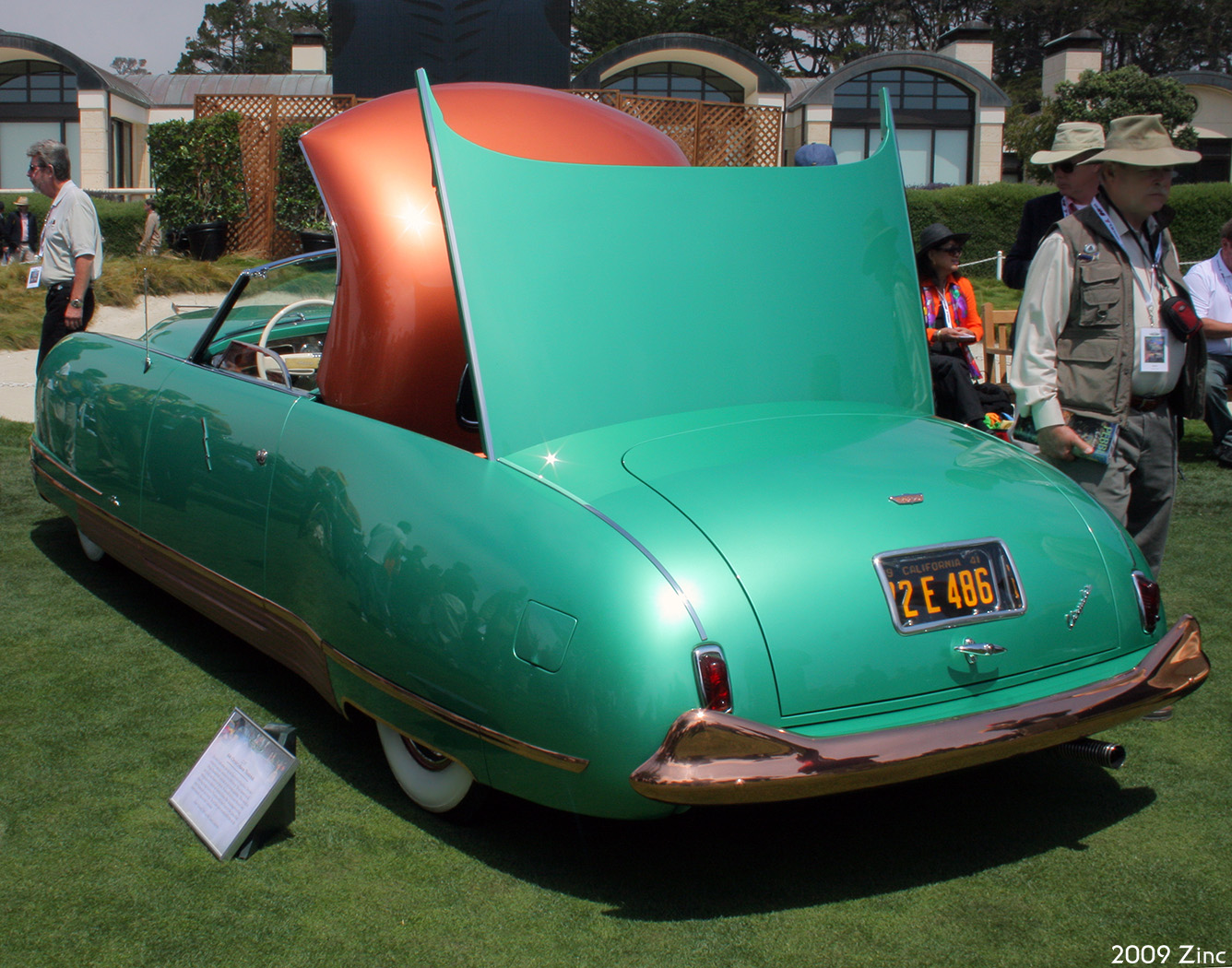
Chrysler Thunderbolt 1941
