= Wilson Body Company =

Michigan company

The C R Wilson Body Company with its plant located at Milwaukee Junction, Detroit, Michigan was incorporated in 1897. Early customers included Cadillac, Ford, Oldsmobile, and many other now forgotten brands.

== Foundation ==
It grew from Wilson brothers' blacksmith and wagon repair shop which soon began to manufacture wagons then carriages. The brothers split the business by products and Charles R Wilson formed the C R Wilson Carriage Company followed by a new incorporation, C R Wilson Body Company.

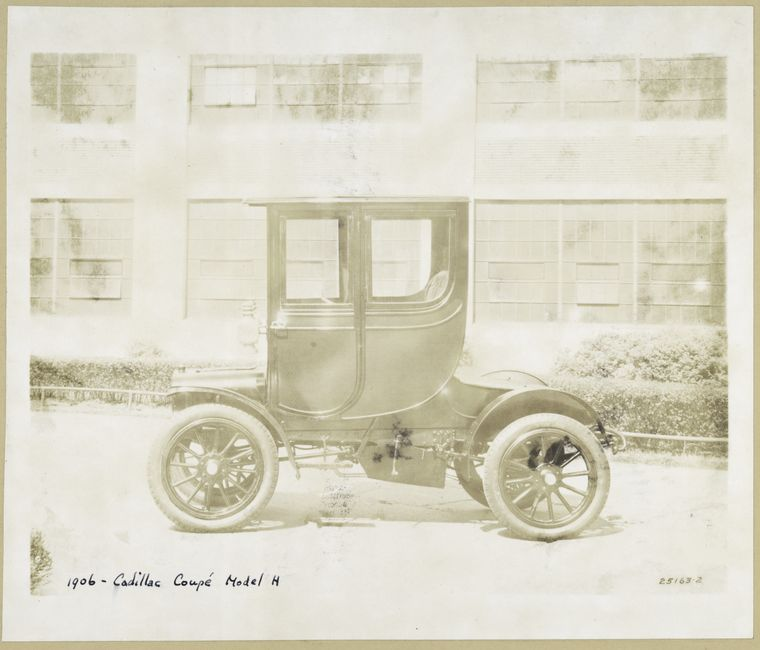
1906 Cadillac coupé

=== Cadillac ===
Wilson built Cadillac's first closed production body.

=== Ford ===
Wilson provided the first bodies for Ford's Model T.

== Alumni ==
Former employees included the Fisher brothers who founded Fisher Body Company. Henry Ford appears in a photograph of Wilson staff dated around 1900.

== Murray Body Corporation ==
On the sudden death of Charles R Wilson in 1924 a merger was negotiated with the owners of J W Murray Manufacturing Company, Towson Body Company and J C Widman Body Company under the name Murray Body Corporation.
