= Murray Corporation of America =

American automotive body supplier

Murray Corporation of America run from 1600 Clay Street, Detroit Michigan was, from 1925 until 1939, a major supplier of complete automobile bodies to Ford. Non-automotive stamped steel products were added during the Great Depression of the 1930s. Production switched to wings for wartime aircraft and other aircraft components. Post World War II, it moved further into stainless steel products including cabinets and kitchen sinks. Washing machines, plumbing and bathroom fixtures, cutting tools and truck engine parts followed. Its last automotive products plant was sold in 1955.

By the 1960s a Fortune 500 company Murray later passed through the ownership of Dyson Kissner-Moran to Household International which is now a subsidiary of HSBC.

== Automotive bodies industry consolidation ==
J W Murray Mfg Co was founded in 1913 by John William Murray and his son to make stamped sheet metal part for automobiles. its premises were in Detroit and located near what is now the Cadillac Hamtramck assembly plant. J W Murray established a second plant at Ecorse, Michigan.

Murray Body Corporation was created in 1924 by merging C R Wilson Body Co of Milwaukee Junction, Detroit with three Hamtramck businesses, Murray Manufacturing, Towson and Widman. Both Wilson and Murray were long standing suppliers to Ford. Combined the businesses could build 60,000 to 70,000 bodies a year. Towson Body Co and J C Widman & Co. (Towson include the Anderson Electric Car Co) were Murray's neighbors in Hamtramck.

On the merger Murray Body Corporation became, after Fisher and Briggs, the third largest body company in the United States.

A short sharp recession forced a financial reorganization and as of January 1927 the business was moved into the ownership of Murray Corporation of America.

== Custom bodywork ==
Raymond H Dietrich

== Clarence Avery ==
Clarence Avery, recruited from Ford in 1927 and driving force of Murray for 20 years, is credited with introducing his industry to time-study and the moving assembly line. Avery was also well known for dealing effectively with autoworkers grievances working in with UAW.
