= Howard "Dutch" Darrin =

American free-lance automotive stylist

Howard "Dutch" Darrin (1897–1982) was an American free-lance automotive stylist born in Cranford, New Jersey.

Darrin had been a US pilot serving in France in the last years of World War I when he met fellow countryman Thomas Hibbard. They were employed after the war as designers by Brewster & Co which they left. Hibbard had helped to establish LeBaron and taking Darrin visited France to supervise construction of some LeBaron bodies in Paris. They then stayed on in Paris and established first their own design practice, then set up their own factory in Paris: Hibbard & Darrin at Puteaux.

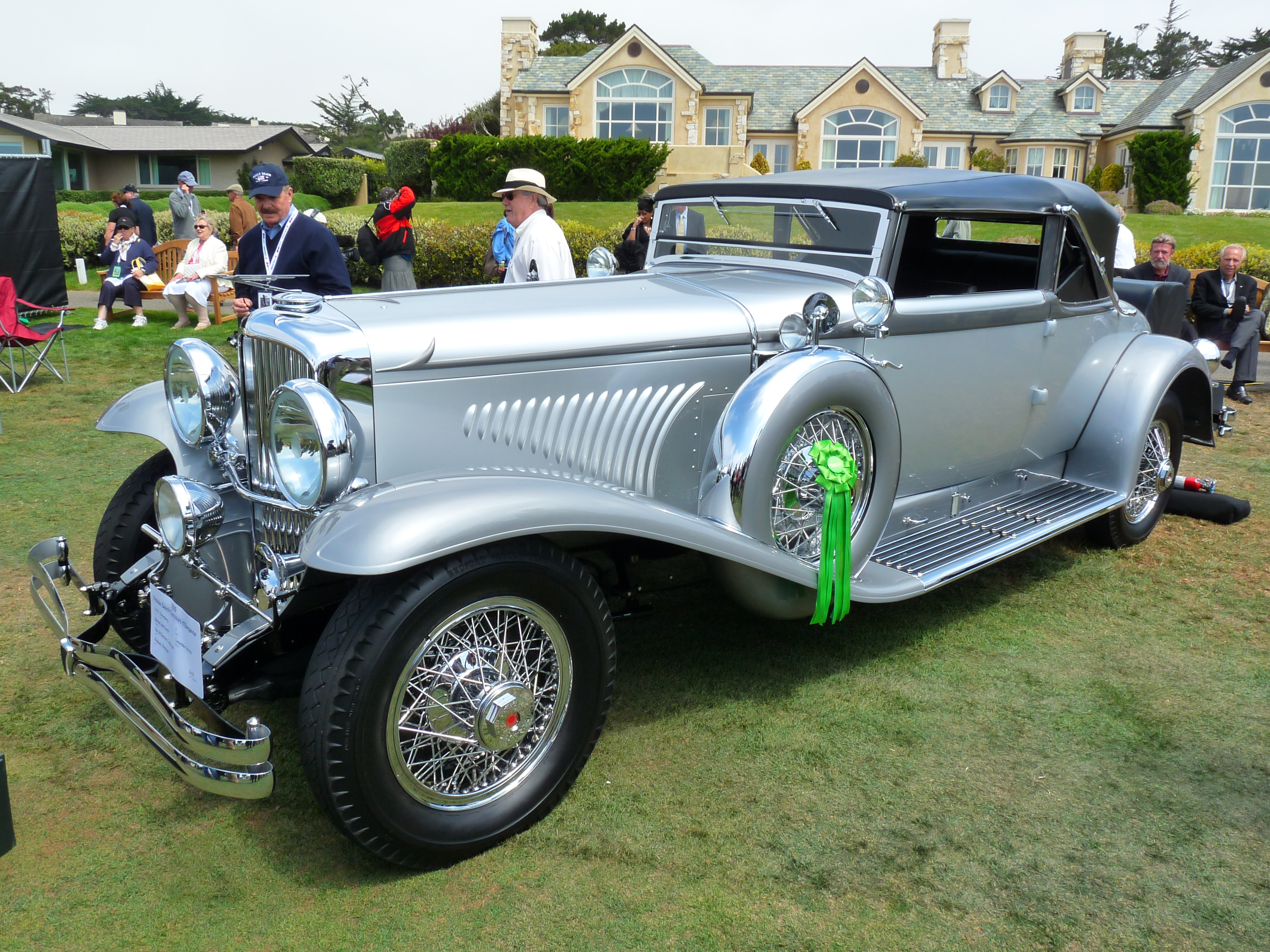
1930 Duesenberg convertible by Hibbard & Darrin

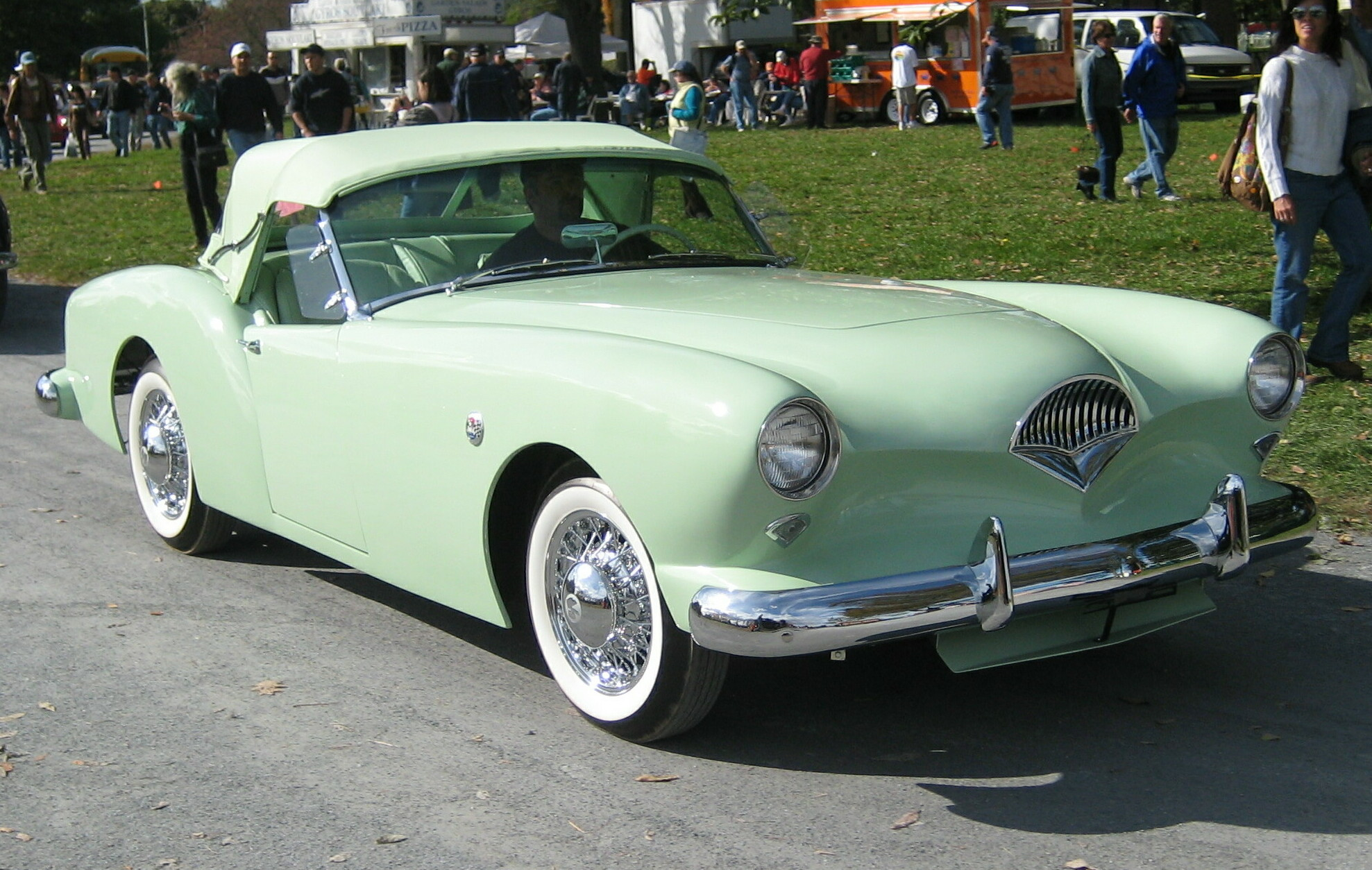
Kaiser Darrin coloured „light green“, 1954

Undercapitalised, they were forced to shut down by the financial crisis of 1929 which badly affected their American backer's resources. Hibbard took a design position back home in General Motors. After a second successful partnership in Paris, known as Carrosserie Fernandez et Darrin, Howard Darrin returned home in 1937 and settled in Hollywood.

There he began to design special automobile bodies on luxury chassis for Hollywood stars. He also developed an association with the Packard Motor Company and his designs for Packard were produced in relatively short runs by plants sited nearer Packard's own home. Production seems to have ended with the onset of World War II.

After WWII he started as a freelance consultant. He started with sedans for Kaiser. The first Kaiser models that Darrin designed went from non-existent to number eight in new car sales within two years (1947-1948). In 1951 Darrin designed the Kaiser Manhattan, which had a fiberglass body. In 1952 the sports car Kaiser Darrin was presented. This car competed with the Chevrolet Corvette and was marketed as an alternative to spartan foreign roadsters such as MGs and Austin Healeys. His last car was the DKW Flintridge, an open two seater. It was presented in 1957. He worked in industry design until he died in 1982.
