= Dietrich Inc. =

American coachbuider

Dietrich Inc. was an American coachbuilder founded in 1925 by Raymond H. Dietrich (1894–1980), co-founder of LeBaron Incorporated in New York City. He was a close friend to Edsel Ford who supported him by talking the owner of the J W Murray Manufacturing Co into partly financing the venture. Murray was itself a vendor of standard bodies to the Ford Motor Company, and hoped for an in-house source for designing and building custom bodies for luxury cars. Dietrich himself held 50% of the stock.

Dietrich, Inc. did substantial styling work for standard bodies for Packard, Franklin, and Erskine, a corporate make of Studebaker. Further, Dietrich, Inc. built custom bodies to single orders, and proposed semi-customs (similarly built as full customs, but in small lots of usually 5–10 units) for the catalogues of Lincoln (then headed by Edsel Ford) or Packard. Raymond Dietrich further was a design consultant with Packard.

By September 1930, Dietrich was out of his company. Dietrich, Inc. was closed in 1936; Raymond Dietrich became in 1932 the first head of design of Chrysler (until 1938).

Afterwards, he freelanced as Raymond H. Dietrich and finally Ray Dietrich Inc. One of his primary clients was the Checker Cab Manufacturing Company, (renamed Checker Motors Corporation in 1958) in Kalamazoo, MI. while at Checker he partnered with Auburn engineer Herb Snow and developed the ill-fated front wheel drive, transverse engine Model "D" Checker prototype. Dietrich was also instrumental in designing the Checker Model A2 introduced in the fall of 1947. Dietrich's office at Checker remained untouched years after his death.

Dietrich retired to Kalamazoo, Michigan in 1960 at the age of 66. At the time, Kalamazoo was the home of Gibson Guitars and in 1962, Gibson boss Ted McCarty, convinced Dietrich to come out of retirement to design a new solid-body electric guitar that would not be limited by the traditional ways of designing and engineering an electric guitar - the result was the classic, 'reverse' Gibson Firebird, released in 1963, one of the most iconic and recognisable electric guitar designs ever. Its bass guitar counterpart, the Thunderbird, was released alongside it, meant to rival the successes of Fender's Precision and Jazz basses.

== Gallery ==
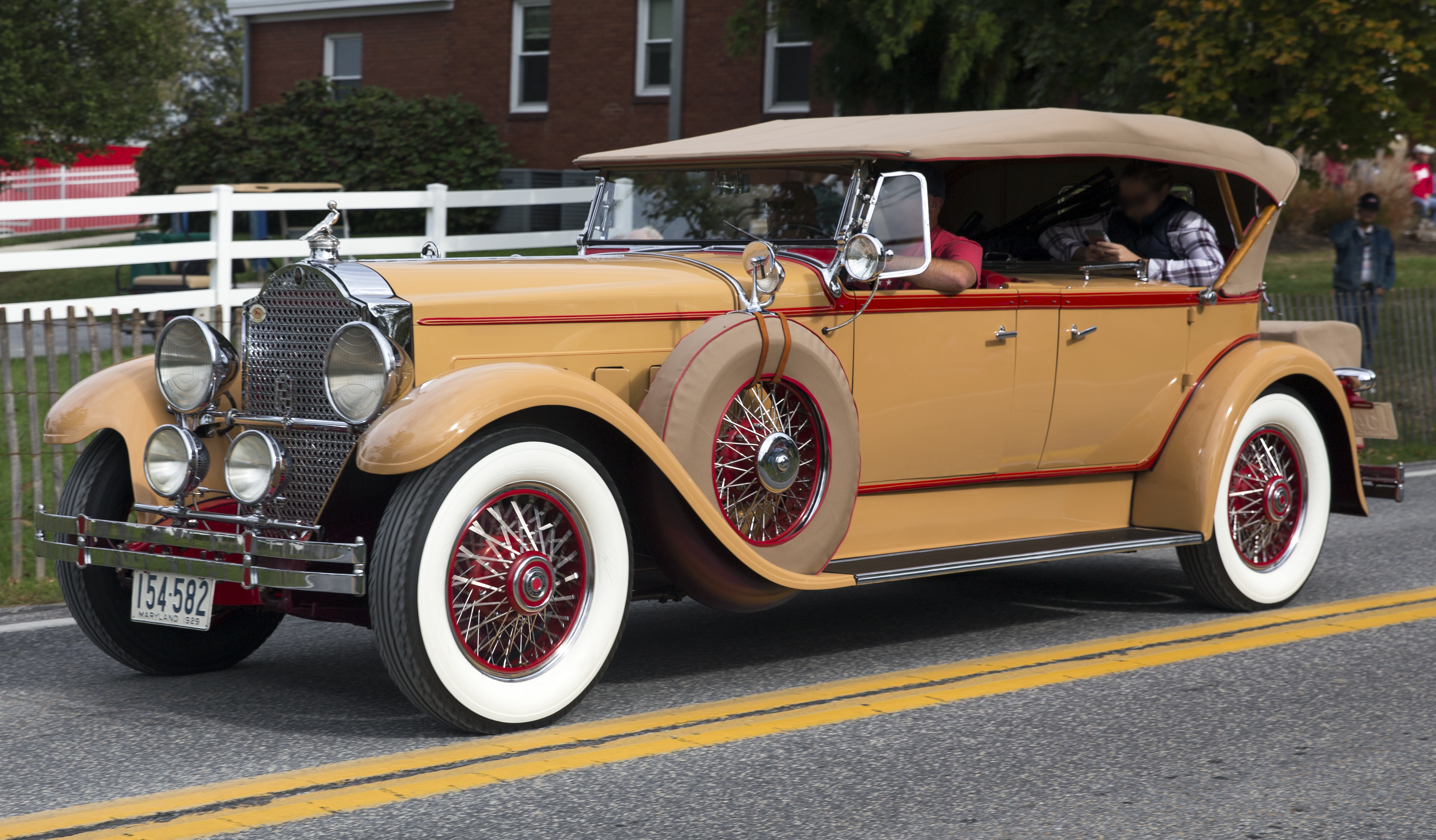
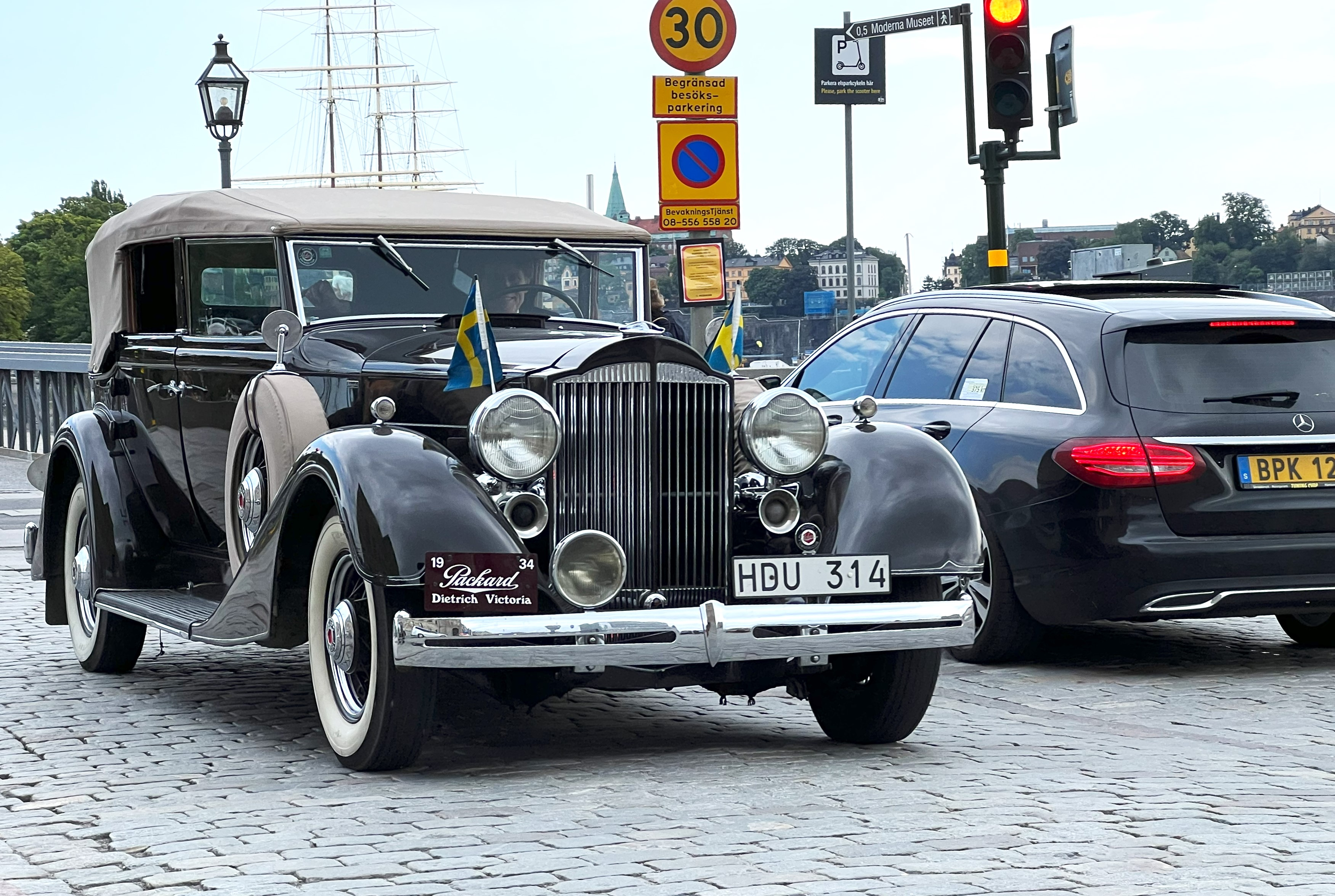
1934 Packard Eight 1101 Convertible Sedan
1929 Packard DeLuxe Eight (model 645) with Dietrich Dual-Cowl Phaeton bodywork

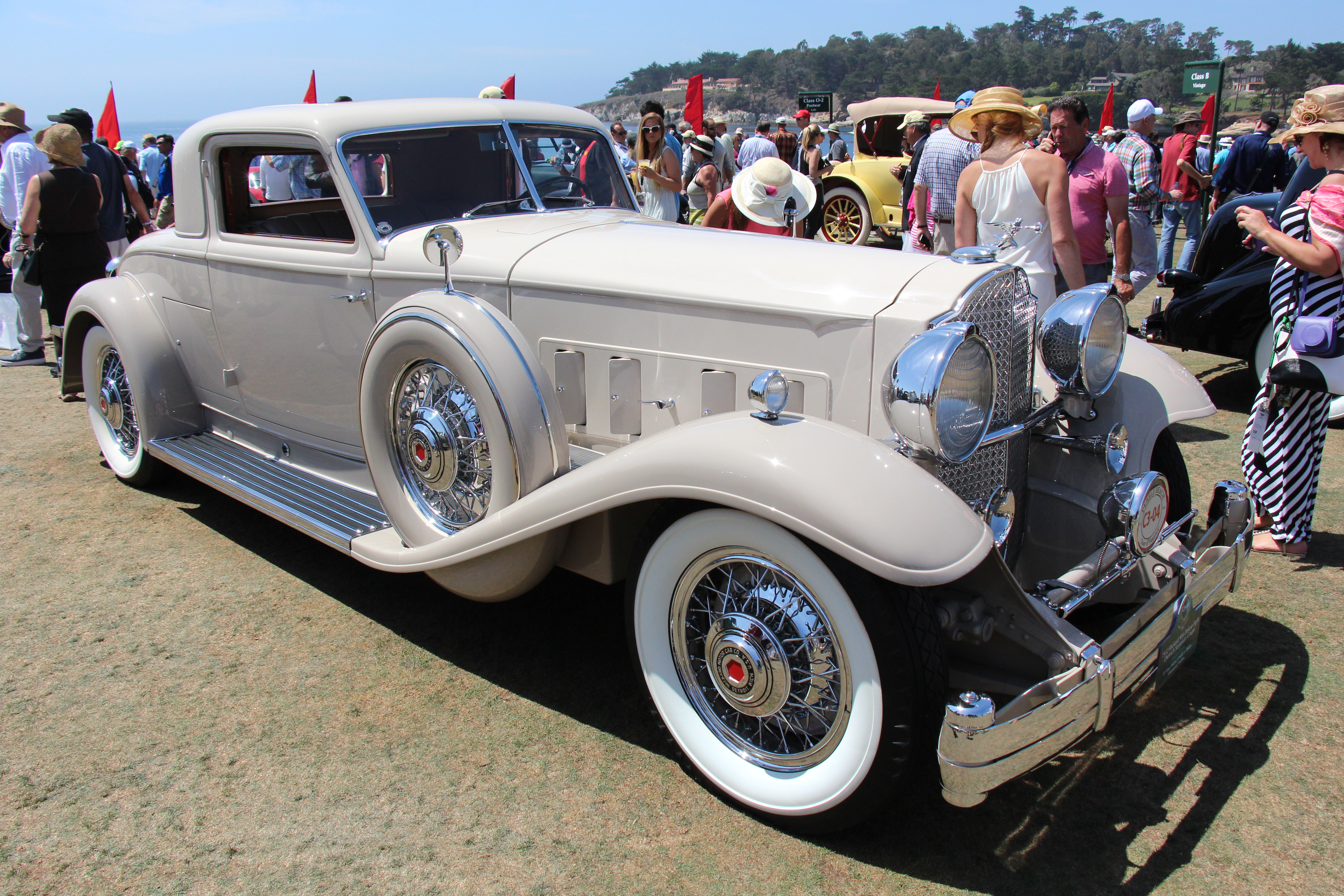
1932 Packard 904 Deluxe 8 Coupe with custom coachwork by Dietrich

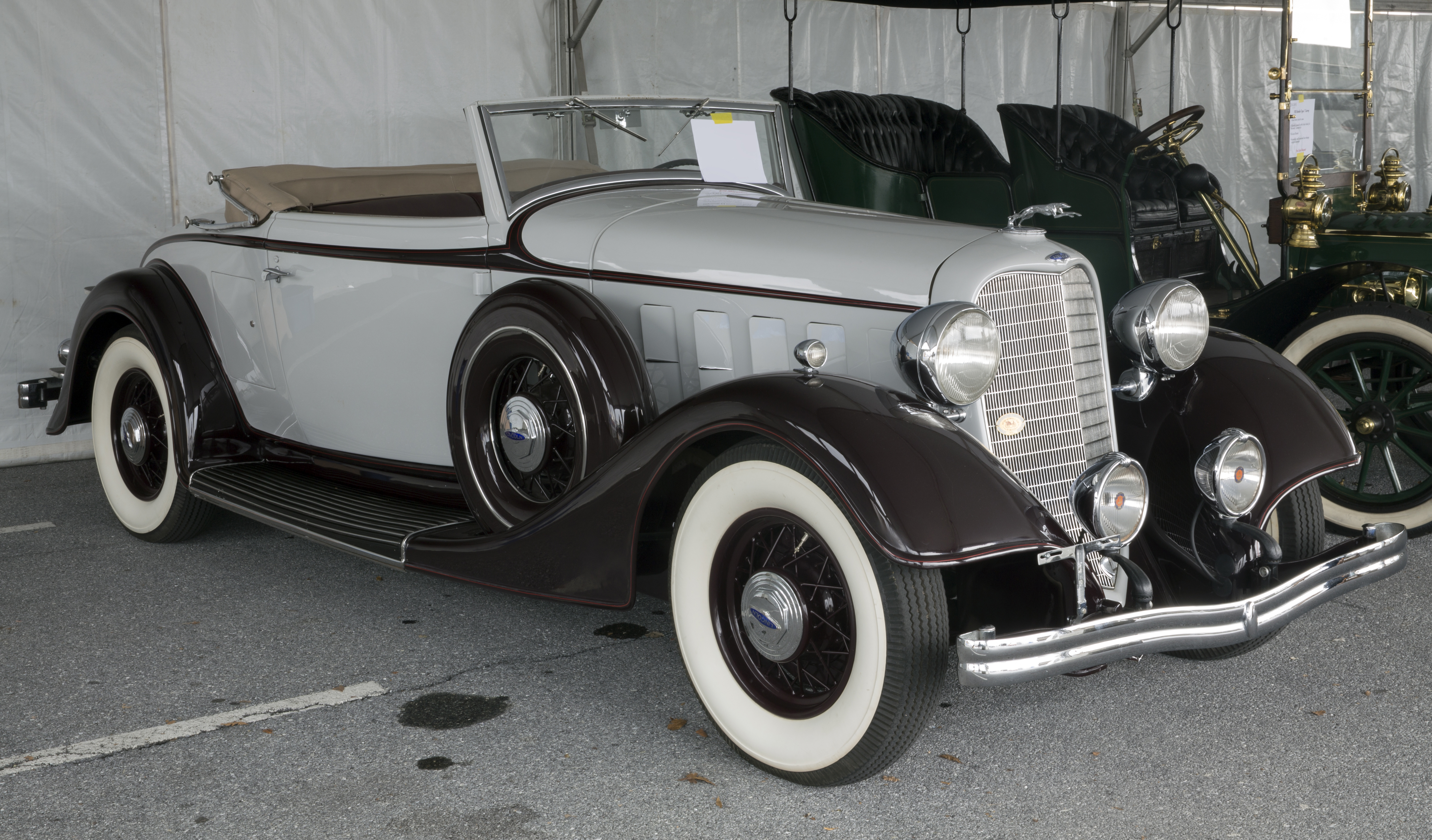
1934 Lincoln KA Coupe Roadster with a body designed by Dietrich

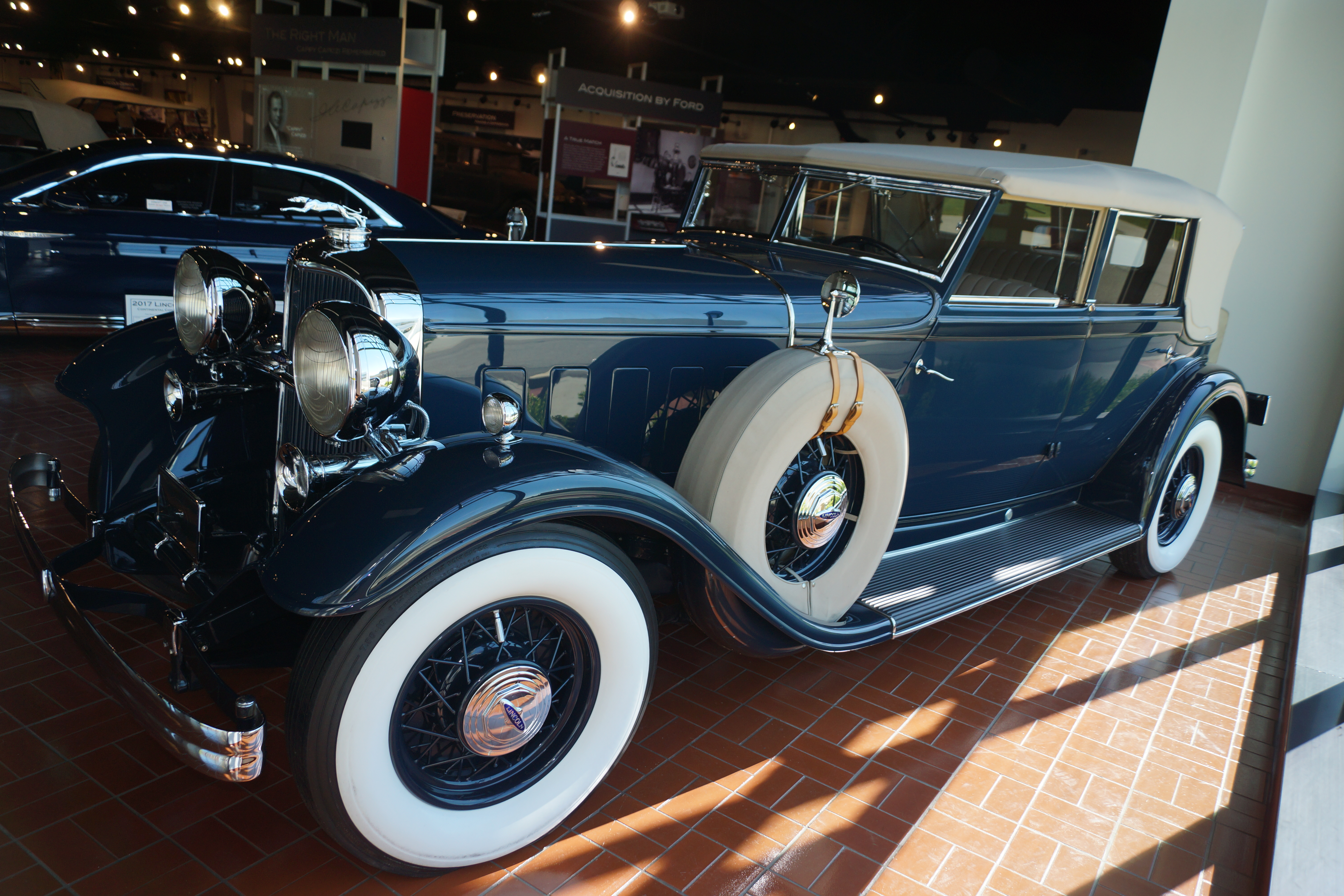
1934 Lincoln KB Convertible Sedan by Dietrich

== Sources ==
- Richard M. Langworth: Automobiles of the 1930s. Beekman House New York 1980. ISBN 0-517-30994-7.
- Pfau, Hugo: The Coachbuilt Packard; Dalton-Watson Ltd. London / Motorbooks International Minneapolis (1973), ISBN 0-901564-10-9
- Kimes, Beverly R. (Herausgeberin) Packard, a history of the motor car and the company; General edition, 1978 Automobile Quarterly, ISBN 0-915038-11-0
- Hutton, Ray and Lewandowski, Jürgen: Lincoln – An American Tradition, Delius Klasing Verlag, Bielefeld (Hrsg. Lincoln / Ford Motor Company), 1. Auflage 2000, ISBN 3-7688-1125-5
- Kimes, Beverly Rae and Langworth, Richard M. (editors): The Golden Anniversary of the Lincoln Motor Car 1921–1971; Automobile Quarterly, Inc., New York (1970), Library of Congress Card No 26,4005
- Woudenberg, Paul R.: Lincoln and Continental 1946–1980 – The classic Postwar Years; Motorbooks International, Osceola WI (USA) 1993, ISBN 0-87938-730-0
- Dammann, George H.: 70 Years of Chrysler, Crestline Publishing Co., Glen Ellyn IL (1974), Osceola WI, ISBN 0-912612-06-1
- Hildebrand, George (editor.): The Golden Age of the Luxury Car - An Anthology of Articles and Photographs from Autobody, 1927–1931; Dover Publications, Inc.; 1980, ISBN 0-486-23984-5
