= Packard XJ41 =

XJ41
- Type: Turbojet
- National origin: United States
- Manufacturer: Packard
- First run: January 8, 1946
- Manufactured: up to 7

The Packard XJ41 was a turbojet aircraft engine developed by the Packard company in the mid-1940s.

== Design and development ==
In 1943, Packard leased a government-owned manufacturing plant located on the outskirts of Toledo, Ohio. The plant was previously operated by the defunct Aviation Corporation. Packard used the leased plant to manufacture parts for the Rolls-Royce Merlin engine, and referred to it as its Toledo Division. In the early-summer of 1944, the Army Air Force Materiel Command contracted with Packard to carry out "advanced aircraft engine development" on both the Merlin and gas-turbine engines. To oversee the new project, Packard hired Allison Engine Company's Robert M. Williams as their chief design engineer at the Toledo facility in July of that year. In early 1945 the Power Plant Lab at Wright Field asked Packard to take on a research project to develop an expendable jet engine of 4,000 lbf (18,000 N), weighing no more than 1,000 lb (450 kg). Design work for the engine, designated Packard XJ41, began in May 1945.

After studying existing turbojet engines it was decided to design an engine which would be a significant advancement over conventional turbo-jet engines, have a low manufacturing cost, minimum use of strategic materials and be a lightweight design.

The Packard XJ41 met those requirements with a combination of a mixed flow compressor, a lightweight annular combustion chamber and hollow turbine blades for both rotor and stator. The engine's most outstanding design characteristic was the use of an air inlet that operated at supersonic speed that produced more thrust per pound of weight than designs using low-velocity inlet air. The XJ41 weighed 1,100 lb (500 kg) and produced 4,000 lbf (18,000 N), where the Allison J33 weighed 1,820 lb (830 kg) at the same thrust. The XJ41 was completed and operating on a test stand by January 8, 1946.

Packard's investment for production of the new turbojet engine design was extensive. By the end of 1946, the installation of fabrication and testing equipment was valued at $10,000,000. In addition, flight testing, shop, and hangar facilities at Willow Run, Michigan was valued at $1,000,000, and an additional $3,500,000 in laboratory and testing equipment was installed by spring of 1947.

Serial numbers V-500001 to V-500007 were allocated, indicating that at least seven engines were built. Development continued on the engine over three years, with Packard assigning model numbers PT-103 and PT-104 to military engine designations XJ41 serial number V-500001 and XJ41 serial number V-500003. A design study for an engine suitable for high acceleration, such as a catapult launched take-off, was assigned model number PT-106 in February 1947. Between September 1947 and July 1948 an XJ41 was flight-tested several times attached to a North American B-25J Mitchell bomber.

Development of the XJ41 stopped when Packard engineers came up with a radical redesign that differed so much the designation XJ49 was assigned. All work on the XJ41 stopped and funding was transferred to the new design.

== Specifications (XJ41-V-500003) ==
Data from Master Motor Builders

==== General characteristics ====
- Type:
- Length:
- Diameter:
- Dry weight: 1,100 lb (499 kg)

==== Components ====
- Compressor: single-stage Mixed-flow (combined axial and centrifugal)
- Combustors: annular combustion chamber
- Turbine: single stage hollow blades
- Fuel type: Aviation Kerosene jet fuel
- Oil system: pressure fed scavenged spray system with dry sump

==== Performance ====
- Maximum thrust: 4,000 lbf (18 kN)
- Thrust-to-weight ratio: 3.64

== See also ==
Related lists

- List of aircraft engines
