= Packard =

Defunct luxury automobile company

Coordinates: 42°22′49″N 83°01′42″W

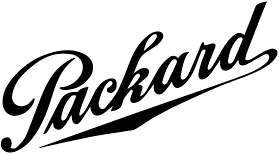
- Formerly: Packard Motor Car Company
- Type: Private (1899–1956)
- Industry: Automotive
- Founded: 1899
- Founders: James Ward Packard; William Doud Packard; George Lewis Weiss
- Defunct: 1956; 70 years ago
- Fate: Merged with Studebaker to form Studebaker-Packard in 1954; 'Packard' brand name dropped in 1962
- Successor: Studebaker-Packard
- Headquarters: Detroit, Michigan, U.S.
- Key people: Henry B. Joy
- Products: Automobiles

James Ward Packard

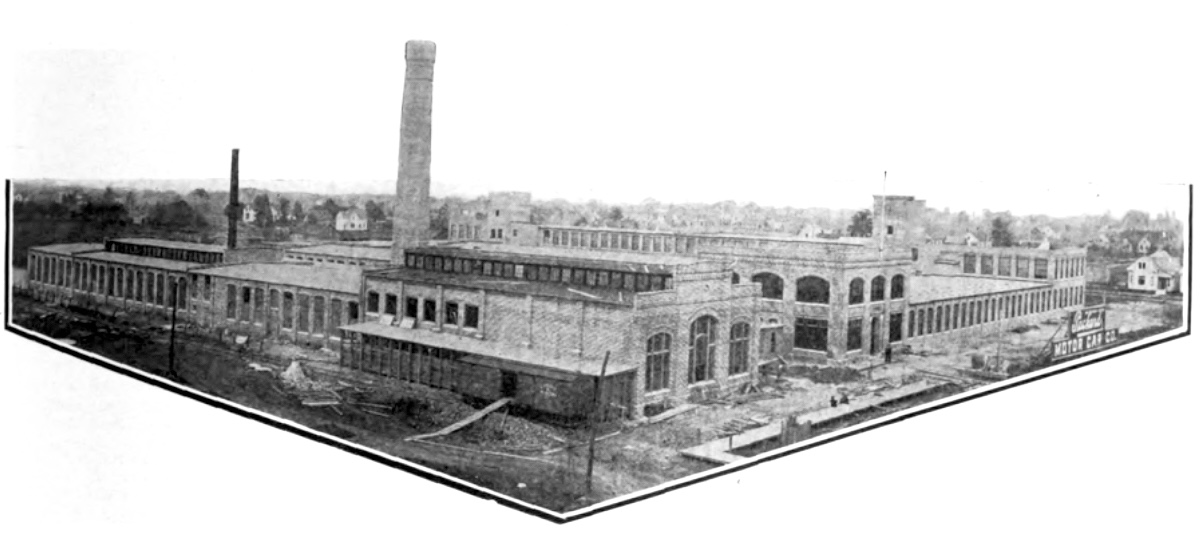
Packard plant (1903)

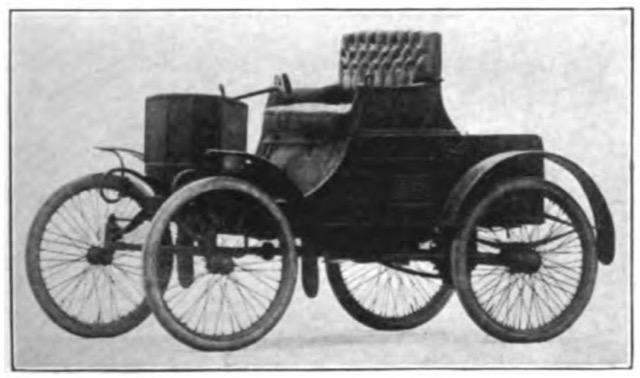
Packard (1899)

Packard (formerly the Packard Motor Car Company) was an American luxury automobile company located in Detroit, Michigan. The first Packard automobiles were produced in 1899, and the last Packards were built in South Bend, Indiana, in 1958.

One of the "Three Ps" – alongside Peerless Motor Company and Pierce-Arrow – the company was known for building high-quality luxury automobiles before World War II. A Packard was a prestigious vehicle, and surviving examples are often found in museums and automobile collections.

Packard vehicles featured innovations, including the modern steering wheel, air-conditioning in a passenger car, and one of the first production 12-cylinder engines, adapted from developing the Liberty L-12 engine during to power World War I warplanes.

During World War II, Packard produced 55,523 units of the two-stage/two-speed supercharger equipped 1,650 cu in (27.0 L) Merlin V-12s engines under contract with Rolls-Royce. Packard also made the 2,490 cu in (40.8 L) updated version of the Liberty V-12 engine used to power United States Navy PT boats.

After the Second World War, Packard struggled to survive as an independent automaker against the domestic Big Three of General Motors, Ford, and Chrysler. As a stopgap until planned consolidation with American Motors Company (AMC) could occur, Packard merged with Studebaker in 1953 and formed the Studebaker-Packard Corporation. Disagreements among the firms' executives thwarted the AMC plans, so Studebaker-Packard remained a separate company. The Packard brand was phased out in 1959 after two years of declining sales of the Studebaker-built 1957 and 1958 model year Packards.

== History ==
Packard war trucks 15,000 until March 31, 1919

Packard Automobiles Produced
Year	Vehicles	Confirmed trucks
1903	?	1
1904	192	
1905	503	
1906	803	
1907	1,188	
1908	1,484	8
1909	2,726	37
1910	4,318	> 331; (33)
1911	4,745	(~ 1,618 from 1903–1911)
1912	4,559	~ 1,068 (fiscal year)
1913	5,242	5,257
1914	4,415	2,000
1915	7,923	4,296
1916	18,572	4,744
1917	19,745	7,638
1918	21,280	6,013
1919	12,937	7,292 (15,000 war trucks)
1920	21,650	5,634
1921	11,153	1,130
1922	16,632	~ 1,250
1923	22,930	~ 1,250
1924	16,153	End of truck production
1925	24,246	0
1926	34,000	0
		0
1948	2,000	0
1949	116,000	0
1950	42,000	0
1951	101,000	0
1954	89,796	0
1955	55,000	0
1956		0
1957		0
1958	Last Packard	0
	July 16, 1958	0

=== 1899–1905 ===
Packard was founded by James Ward Packard, his brother William, and their partner, George Lewis Weiss, in Warren, Ohio, where 400 Packard automobiles were built at their factory on 408 Dana Street Northeast, from 1899 until 1903. A mechanical engineer, James Packard believed they could build a better horseless carriage than the Winton cars owned by Weiss, an important Winton stockholder, after Packard complained to Alexander Winton and offered suggestions for improvement, which were ignored. Winton replied to the suggestions by essentially telling Packard to "go build your own car". Packard's first car was built in Warren, Ohio, on November 6, 1899.

Henry Bourne Joy, a member of one of Detroit's oldest and wealthiest families, bought a Packard. Impressed by its reliability, he visited the Packards and soon enlisted a group of investors, including Truman Handy Newberry and Russell A. Alger Jr. On October 2, 1902, this group refinanced and renamed the New York and Ohio Automobile Company as the Packard Motor Car Company, with James Packard as president. Alger later served as vice president. Packard moved operations to Detroit soon after, and Joy became general manager (later chairman of the board). An original Packard, reputedly the first manufactured, was donated by a grateful James Packard to his alma mater, Lehigh University, and is preserved there in the Packard Laboratory. Another is on display at the Packard Museum in Warren, Ohio.

While the Black Motor Company's Black went as low as $375, Western Tool Works' Gale Model A roadster was $500, the high-volume Oldsmobile Runabout went for $650, and the Cole 30 and Cole Runabout were $1,500, Packard concentrated on cars with prices starting at $2,600. The marque developed a following among wealthy purchasers in the United States and abroad, competing with European marques like Rolls-Royce, Renault, Isotta Fraschini, and Mercedes-Benz.

The 3,500,000 sq ft (330,000 m^{2}) Packard plant on East Grand Boulevard in Detroit was located on over 40 acres (16 ha) of land. Designed by Albert Kahn Associates, it included an early use of reinforced concrete for an automotive factory when building #10 opened in 1906. Its craftsmen practised over 80 trades. The dilapidated plant stood until demolition commenced in September 2022, despite repeated fires. The factory is in close proximity to the current General Motors Detroit/Hamtramck Assembly, which was the former site of the Dodge Vehicle factory from 1910 until 1980. Architect Kahn also designed the Packard Proving Grounds in Shelby Township, Michigan.

=== 1906–1930 ===
From this beginning, through and beyond the 1930s, Packard-built vehicles were perceived as highly competitive among high-priced luxury American automobiles. The company was commonly referred to as being one of the "Three Ps" of American motordom royalty, along with Pierce-Arrow of Buffalo, New York, and Peerless of Cleveland, Ohio. For most of its history, Packard was guided by its president and General Manager James Alvan Macauley, who served as President of the National Automobile Manufacturers Association. Inducted into the Automobile Hall of Fame, Macauley made Packard the number one designer and producer of luxury automobiles in the United States. The marque was also competitive abroad, with markets in 61 countries. Gross income for the company was $21,889,000 in 1928 (equivalent to $410 million in 2025). Macauley was also responsible for the iconic Packard slogan, "Ask the Man Who Owns One".

The Packard Six was initially introduced as a senior-level luxury platform for three years starting in 1913, then upgraded to the Packard Twin Six starting in 1916. The first appearance of the Packard "Goddess of Speed" hood ornament was in 1925 on the Packard Eight and soon adorned all models, while the Cormorant or Swan appeared in the 1930s. The Adonis hood ornament was briefly used in the late 1920s.

In the 1920s, Packard exported more cars than any other in its price class, and in 1930, sold almost twice as many abroad as any other marque priced over US$2,000 (equivalent to $39,000 in 2025). In 1931, 10 Packards were owned by the Imperial House of Japan. Between 1924 and 1930, Packard was also the top-selling luxury brand.

In addition to luxury cars, Packard built trucks. A Packard truck carrying a three-ton load drove from New York City to San Francisco between July 8 and August 24, 1912. In the same year, Packard had service depots in 104 cities.

The Packard Motor Corporation Building at Philadelphia, also designed by Albert Kahn, was built in 1910–1911. It was added to the National Register of Historic Places in 1980.

By 1931, Packards were also being produced in Canada.

Production figures Packard trucks

Year	Production figures	Model	Load capacity	Serial number
1909			to	
1910			to	
1911			to	
1912			to	
1913	1,605	A	3-4.5 to	31640 to 33244
	2,974	A	5-6 to	45026 to 47999
	678	B	2-2.5 to	30360 to 31037
Sum	5,257			
1914	2,000	B	2-2.5 to	48000 to 50000
1915	195	D	2-1.5 to	72026 to 72220
	8	D	1.5-2to	73026 to 73033
	1,200	D	2-2.5 to	73576 to 74775
	2,319	D	3-3.5 to	70026 to 71025; 78451 to 79500; 90001 to 90269
	574	D	4-4.5 to	71026 to 71600
Sum	4,296			
1916	335	D	2-1.5 to	72201 to 72535
	1,170	D	1.5-2to	73034 to 73575; 75701 to 75999; 95301 to 95629
	669	D	2-2.5 to	74776 to 75444
	2,248	D	3-3.5 to	90270 to 92518
	322	D	4-4.5 to	71601 to 71922
Sum	4,744			
1917	2,007	E	1-2.5 to	105051 to 107057
	4,515	E	3-3.5 to	113001 to 117515
	1,116	E	5-6 to	124001 to 125116
Sum	7,638			
1918	1,215	E	1-2.5 to	107058 to 108272
	4,296	E	3-3.5 to	117516 to 121811
	502	E	5-6 to	123001 to 123502
Sum	6,013			
1919	2,115	E	1-2.5 to	175051 to 177165
	4,283	E	4-4.5 to	121812 to 122965; 126000 to 126504; 178001 to 180625
	894	E	5-6 to	183001 to 183894
Sum	7,292			
1920	835	EB	1.5-2 to	177166 to 178000
	1,338	EC	2-2.5 to	185001 to 186283; EC1 to EC55
	2,035	E	3-4.5 to	180626 to 182344; ED1 to ED316
	1,426	E	5-6 to	183895 to 184921; EF1 to EF399
Sum	5,634			
1921	715	E	2-2.5 to	EC56 to EC770
	276	E	3.5-4 to	ED317 to ED592
	139	E	5-6 to	EF400 to EF538
	↑	E	3-3.5 to	180626 to 182344; EF1 to EF399
Sum	1,130			
1922	↓	E	2-2.5 to	EC771 to
	↓	E	3.5-4 to	ED593 to
	↓	E	5-6 to	EF539 to
	↑	E	3-3.5 to	180626 to 182344; EF1 to EF399
Sum				
1923	1,258	EC	to	EC771 to EC2028
	686	ED	to	ED593 to ED1278
	593	EF	to	EF539 to EF1131
	↑	EX	to	EC771 to 2028
	↑	EY	to	EF539 to EF1131
Sum	2,537	incl. 1922		
Sum				

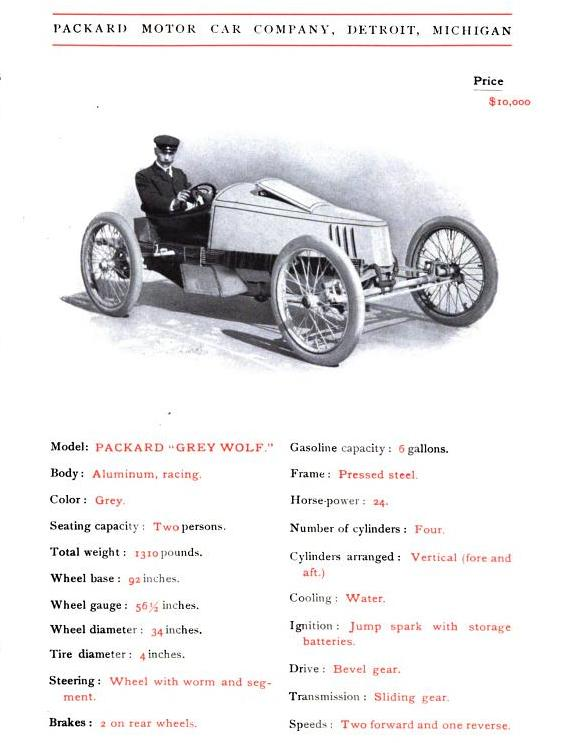
Ca.1904 Packard Grey Wolf

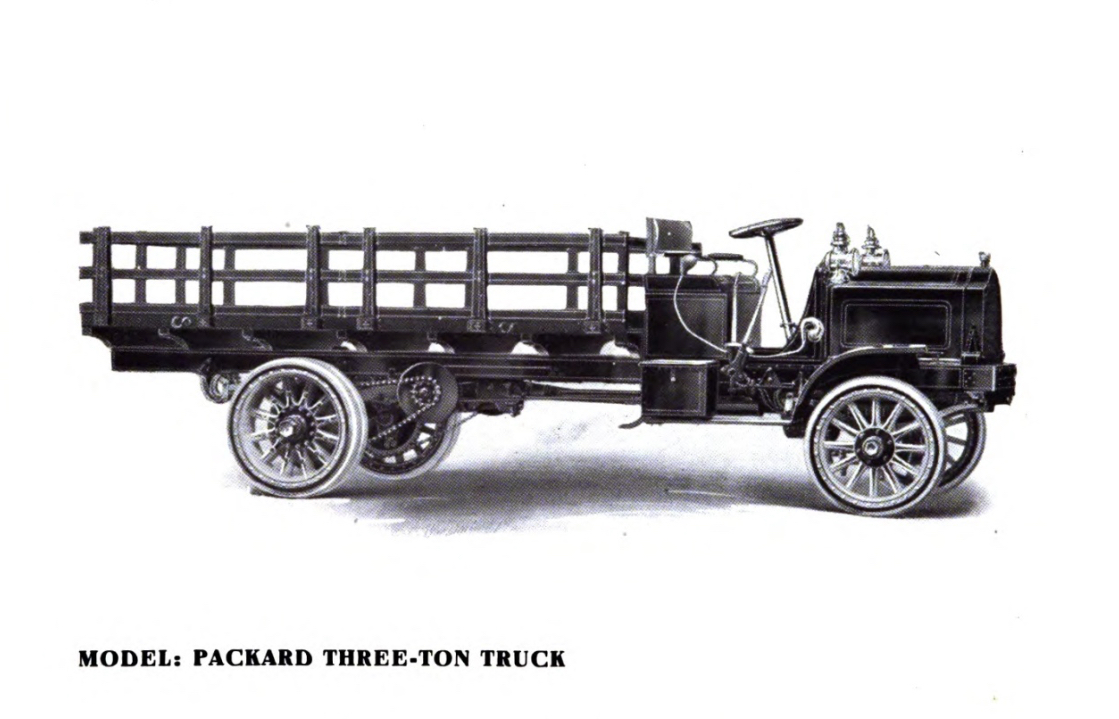
Packard 3t (1908–1912)

Packard 3 to Truck (1908–1912)

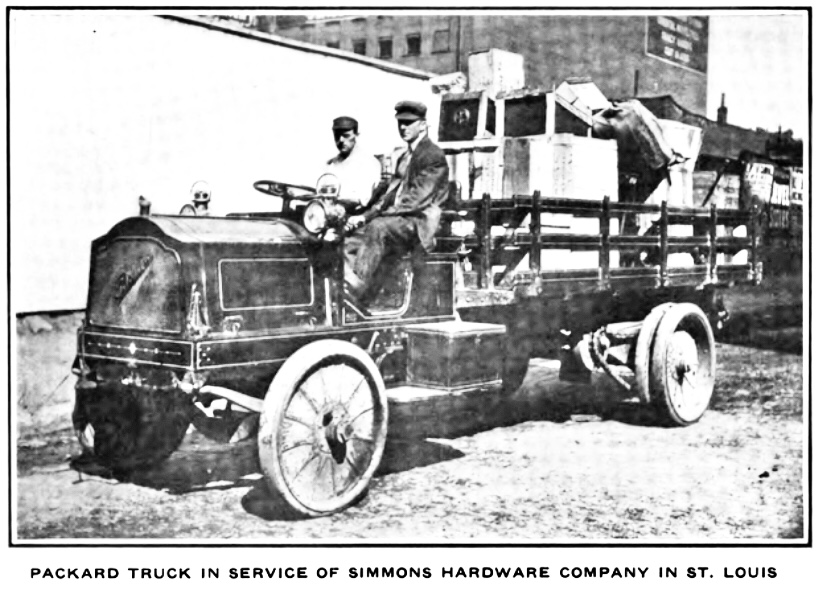
Packard 5 t (1909)

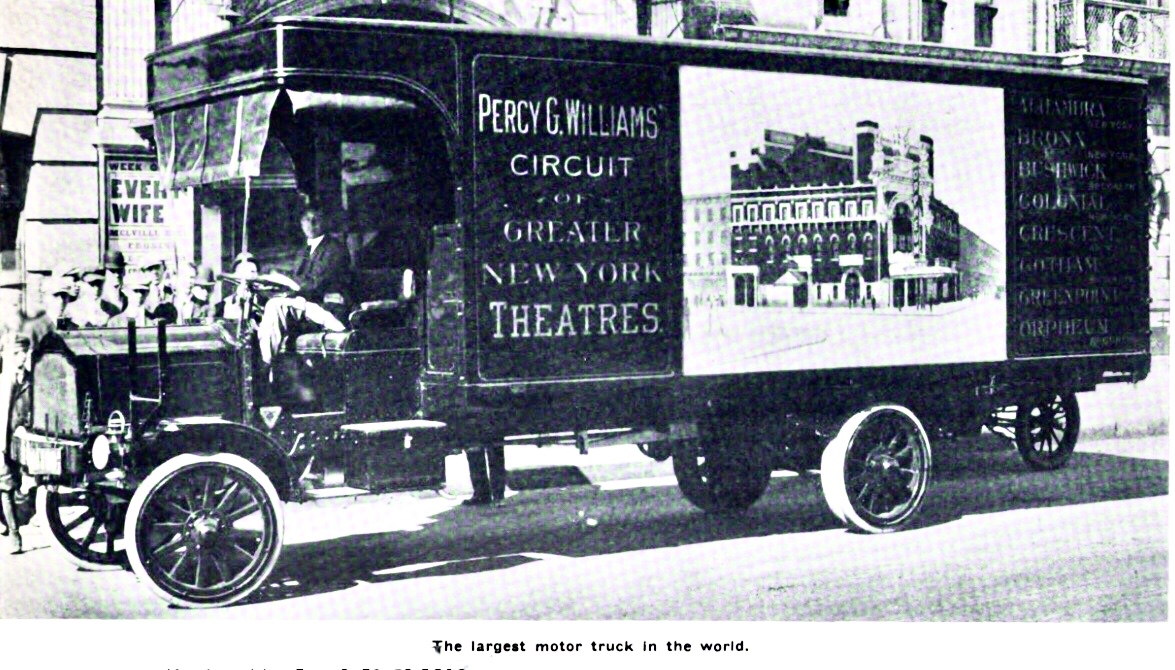
Packard 3t (1911) „the largest Truck in the World“

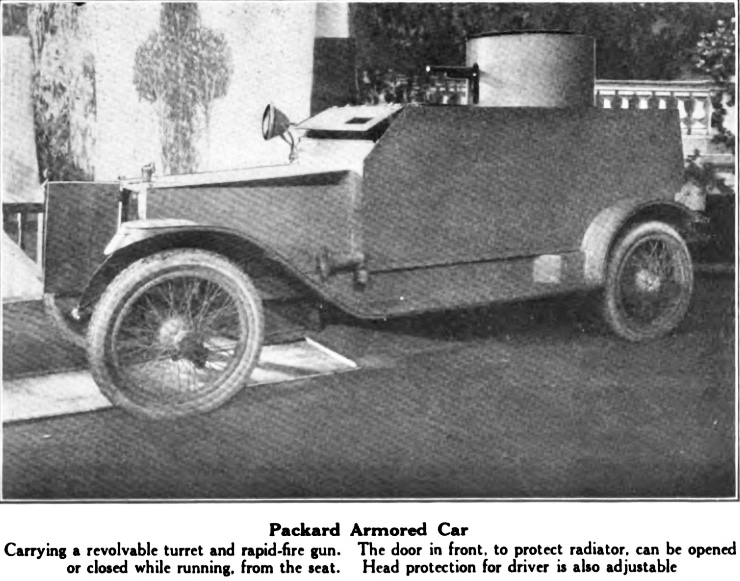
Packard Armored Car (1915)

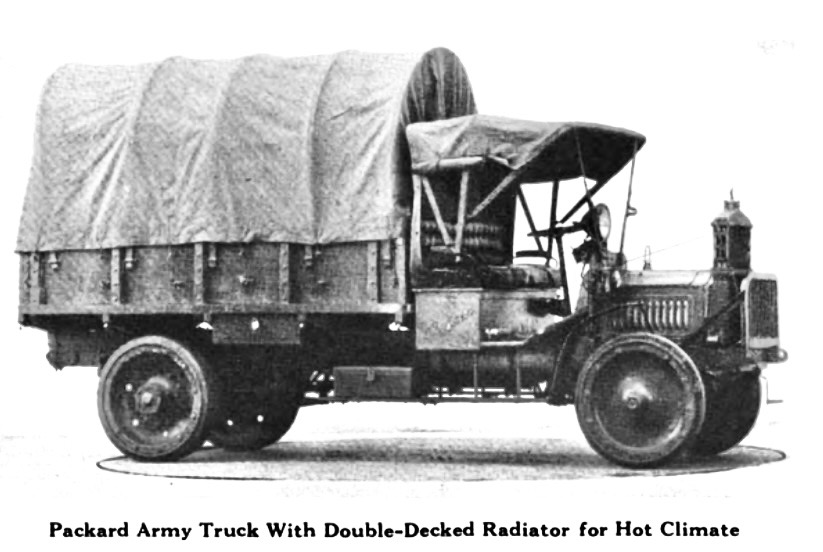
Packard Model E (1917)

Packard Model D4 (1918)

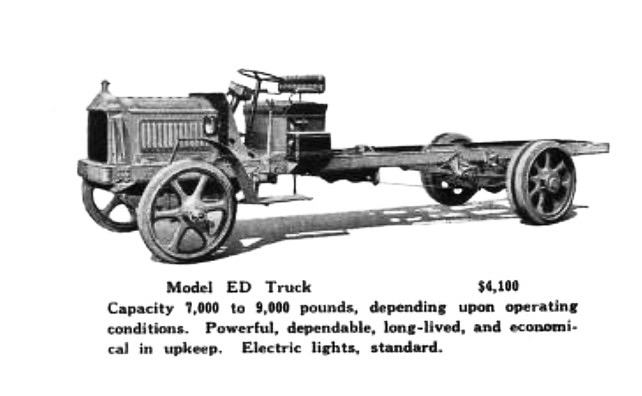
Packard Model ED (1917–1923) 3,4 - 4,5 to

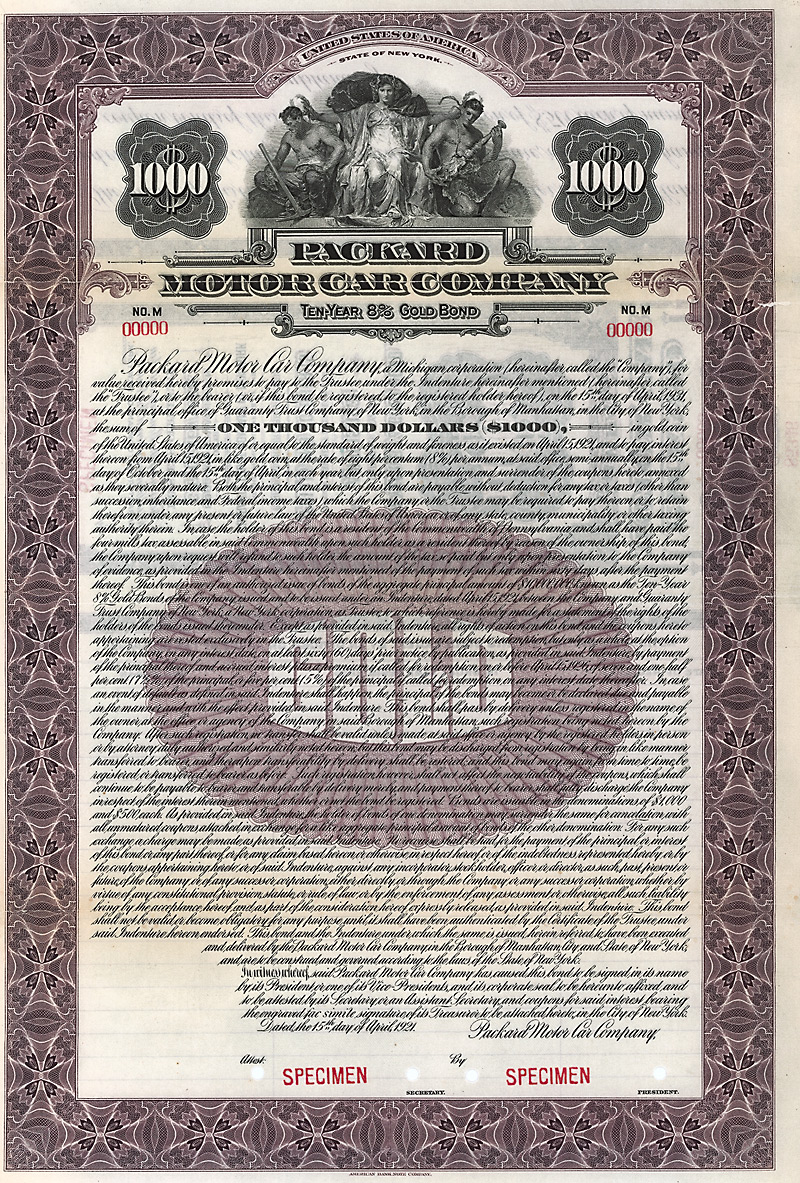
Gold Bond specimen of the Packard Motor Car Company, issued 15 April 1921

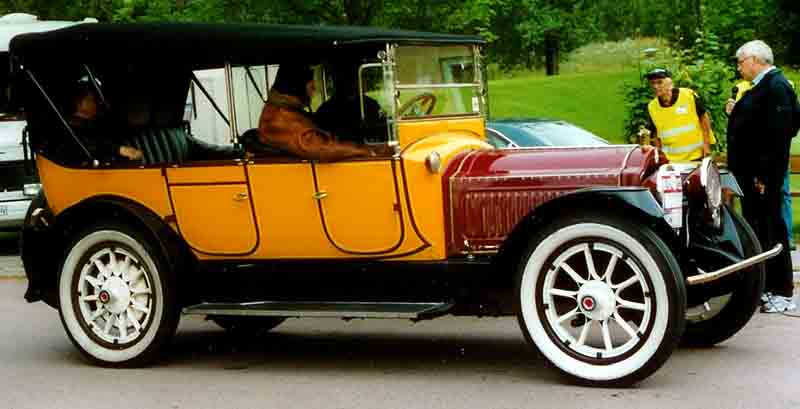
1916 Packard Twin Six Touring (1-35)

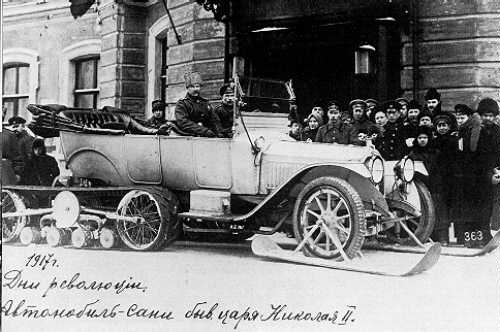
A 1916 Packard Twin-Six Model 1-35 Touring Sedan equipped with Kegresse track belonging to the Emperor of Russia (1917)

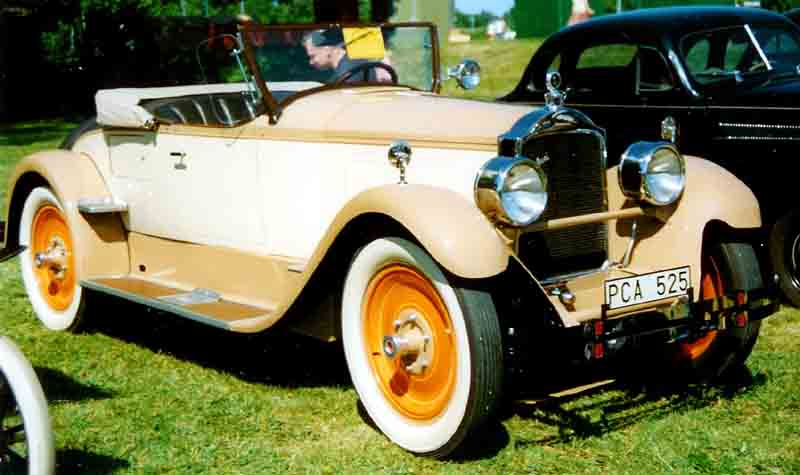
1927 Packard Fourth Series Six Model 426 Runabout Roadster

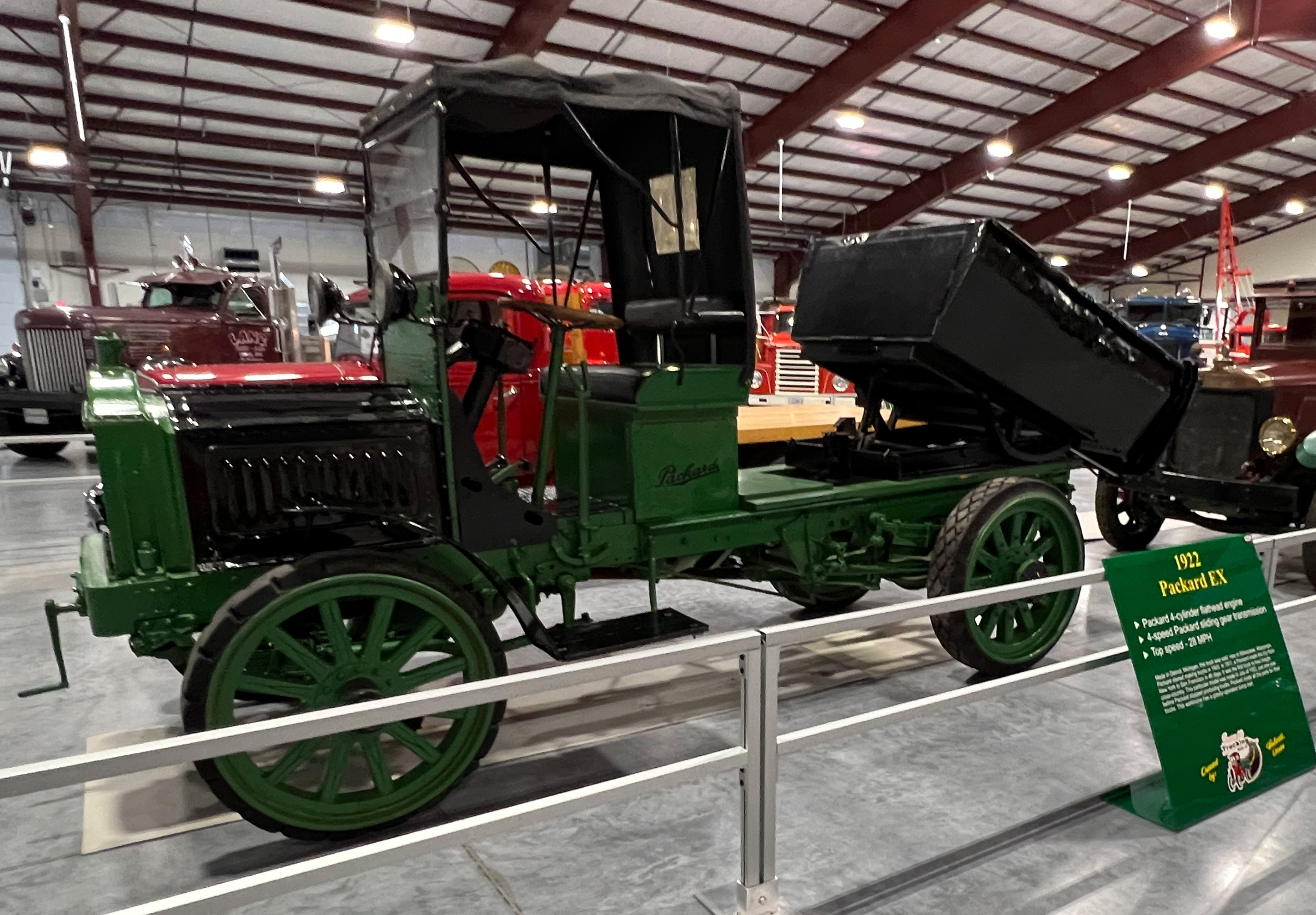
1922 Packard EX truck on display at the Iowa 80 Trucking Museum, Walcott, Iowa

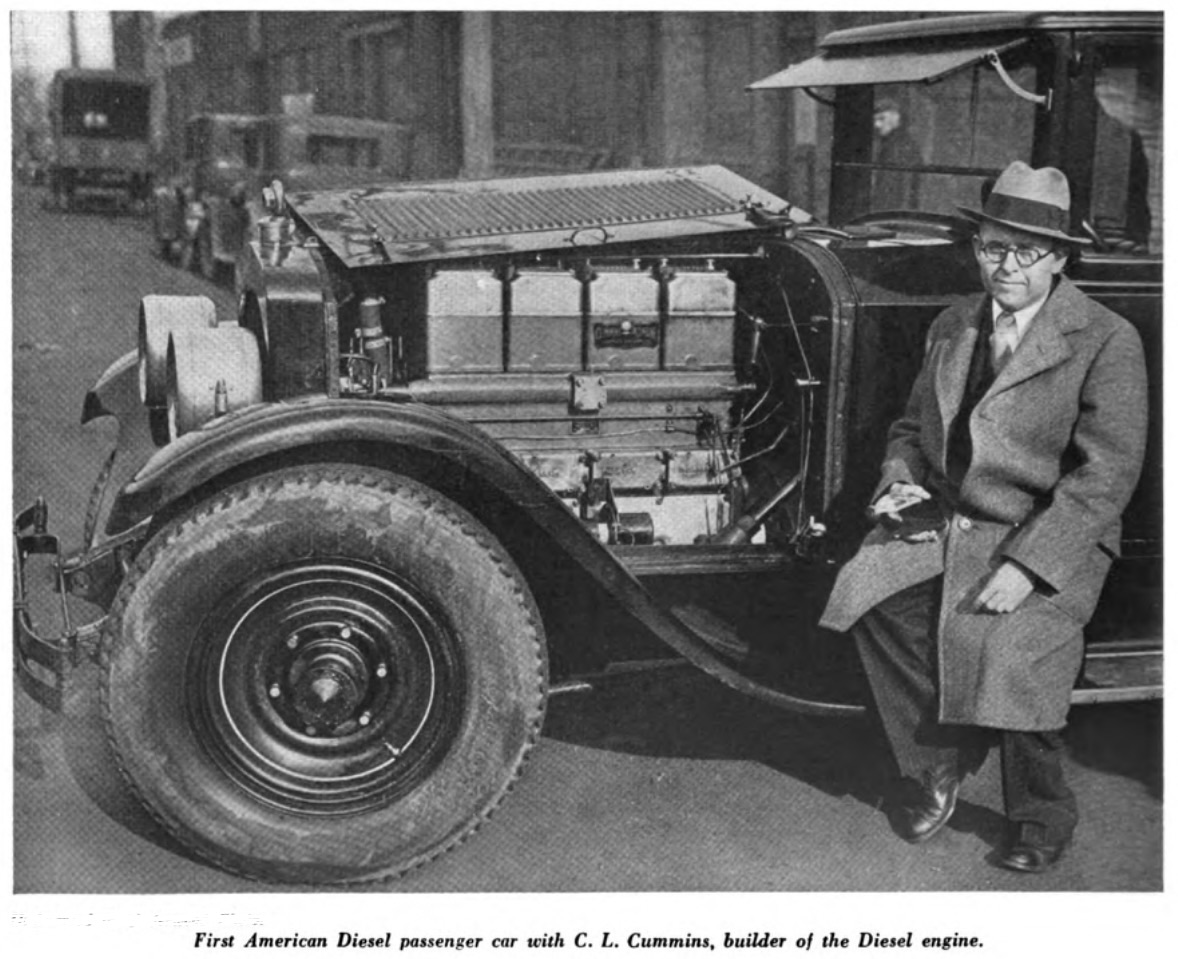
Packard Sedan 7 passenger (1930) first American diesel passenger car

=== 1931–1936 ===
Entering the 1930s, Packard attempted to beat the stock market crash and subsequent Great Depression by manufacturing ever more opulent and expensive cars than it had prior to October 1929, and began offering different platforms that focused on different price points allowing the company to offer more products and remain competitive. While the Eight five-seater sedan had been the company's top-seller for years, the Twin Six, designed by Chief engineer Jesse G. Vincent, was introduced for 1932, with prices starting at US$3,650 (equivalent to $86,000 in 2025); in 1933, it would be renamed the Packard Twelve, a name it retained for the remainder of its run (through 1939). Also in 1931, Packard pioneered a system it called Ride Control, which made the hydraulic shock absorbers adjustable from within the car. For one year only, 1932, Packard fielded an upper-medium-priced car, the Light Eight, at a base price of $1,750 (equivalent to $41,000 in 2025), or $735 (equivalent to $17,000 in 2025) less than the Standard Eight.

Packard rivals Cadillac and Lincoln benefited from the huge support structure of GM and Ford. Packard could not match the two new automotive giants for resources. The 1920s had proven extremely profitable for the company and it had assets of approximately $20 million in 1932 ($472 million in 2025 dollars) while many luxury car manufacturers were almost broke. Peerless ceased production in 1932, converting the Cleveland manufacturing plant automobile production to brewing for Carling Black Label Beer. By 1938, Franklin, Marmon, Ruxton, Stearns-Knight, Stutz, Duesenberg, and Pierce-Arrow had all closed.

Packard had one advantage that some other luxury automakers did not: a single production line. By maintaining a single line and interchangeability between models, Packard was able to maintain low costs. Packard did not change models as often as other manufacturers. Rather than introducing new models annually, Packard began using its own "Series" formula for differentiating its model changeovers in 1923 borrowing a strategy from GM called planned obsolescence. The new model series did not debut on a strictly annual basis, with some series lasting nearly two years, and others lasting as brief as seven months. In the long run, Packard averaged approximately one new series per year. By 1930, Packard automobiles were considered part of its Seventh Series. By 1942, Packard was in its Twentieth Series. The "Thirteenth Series" was omitted due to the western superstition about the number 13.

To meet the challenge of the Depression, Packard started producing more affordable cars in the medium price range. This was a necessary step as the demand for hand-built luxury cars had diminished sharply and people who could afford such vehicles were reluctant to be seen in them when unemployment was over 20%. In 1935, the company introduced the 120, its first car under $1000 (equivalent to $23,000 in 2025). Sales more than tripled that year and doubled again in 1936. To produce the 120, Packard built a separate factory. By 1936, Packard's labor force was divided nearly evenly between the high-priced "Senior" lines (Twelve, Super Eight, and Eight) and the medium-priced "Junior" models, although more than 10 times more Juniors were produced than Seniors. This was because the 120 models were built using thoroughly modern mass production techniques, while the senior Packards used a great deal more hand labor and traditional craftsmanship. Although Packard almost certainly could not have survived the Depression without the highly successful Junior models, they did have the effect of diminishing the Senior models' exclusive image among those few who could still afford a luxury car. The 120 models were more modern in basic design than the Senior models. For example, the 1935 Packard 120 featured independent front suspension and hydraulic brakes, features that did not appear on the Senior Packards until 1937.

During this time, Packards were built in Windsor, Ontario, by the Packard Motor Company of Canada to benefit from Imperial Preference as well as to build right-hand-drive cars for export. Production started in 1931, with the best year being 1937, with just over 2,500 cars built. Parts manufactured in Canada included tires, upholstery, radiator cores, headlamps, springs, and wheels, while the engines were locally assembled. Production ended in 1939, although the company maintained an office in Windsor for many years.

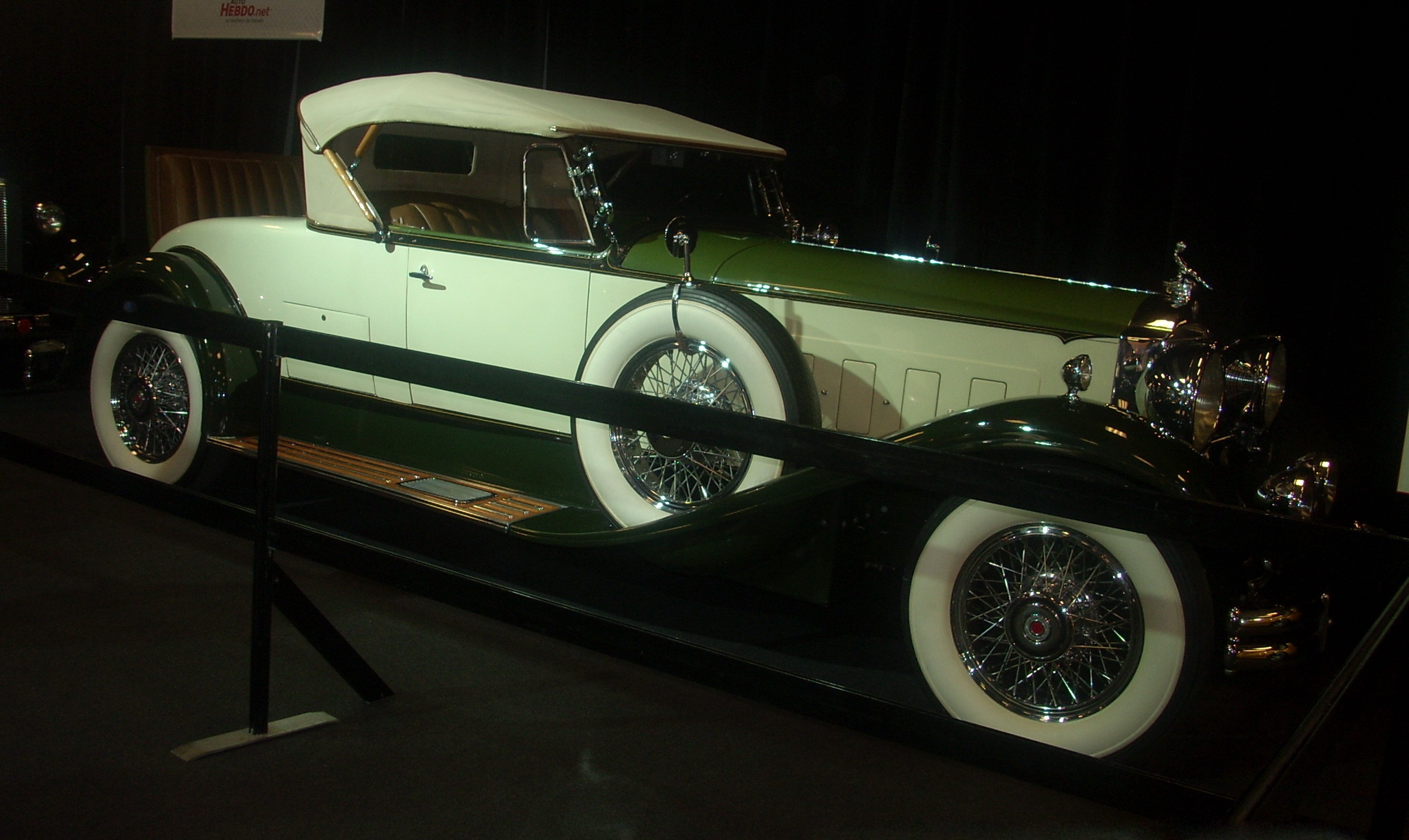
1930 Seventh Series Deluxe Eight model 745 roadster

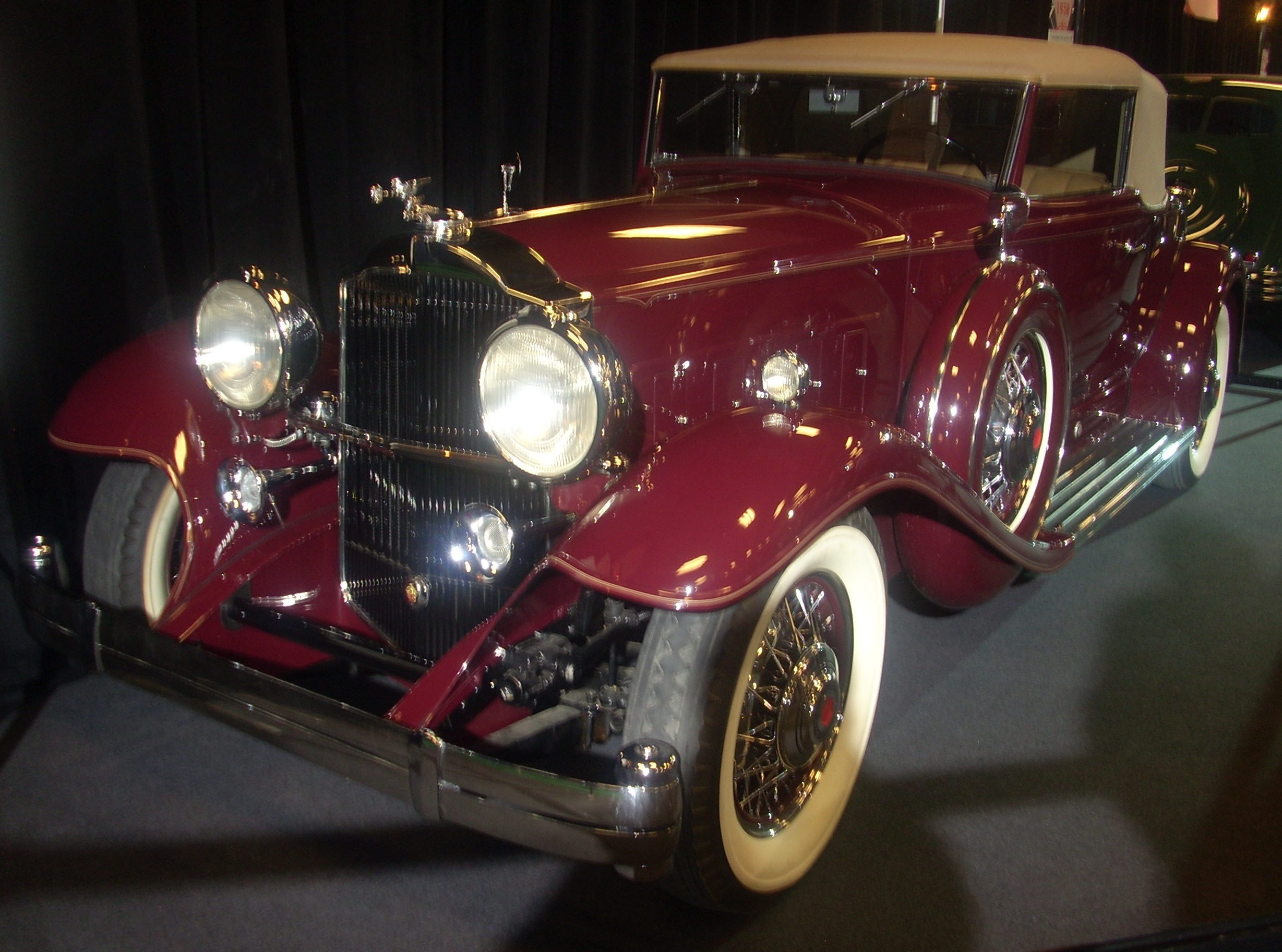
1931 Eighth Series Standard Eight model 833

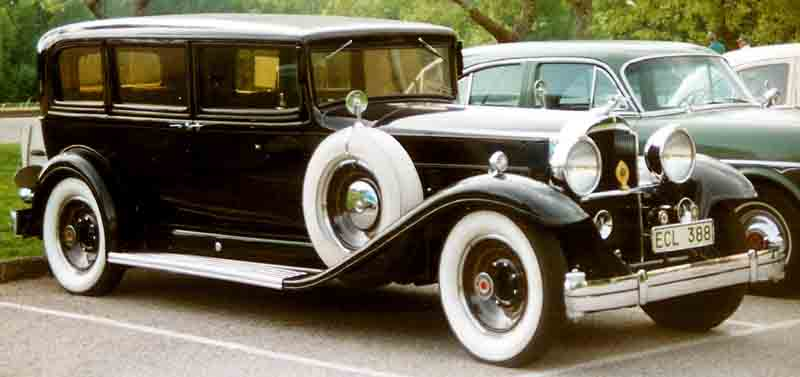
1932 Ninth Series De Luxe Eight model 904 sedan-limousine

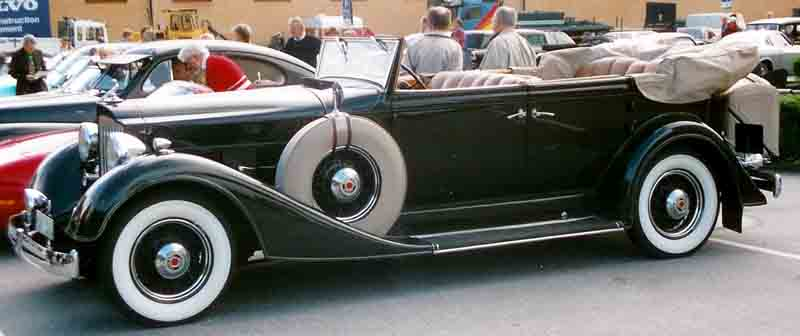
1934 Eleventh Series Eight model 1101 convertible sedan

=== 1937–1941 ===
Packard was still the premier luxury automobile, even though the majority of cars being built were the Packard One-Twenty and Super Eight model ranges. Hoping to catch still more of the market, Packard issued the Packard 115C in 1937, powered by a Packard six-cylinder engine. The decision to introduce the "Packard Six", priced at around $1200 (equivalent to $27,000 in 2025), was in time for the 1938 recession. This model also tagged Packards as something less exclusive than they had been in the public's mind and in the long run hurt Packard's reputation of building some of America's finest luxury cars. The Six, redesignated 110 in 1940–41, continued for three years after the war.

In 1939, Packard introduced Econo-Drive, a kind of overdrive, claimed able to reduce engine speed 27.8%; it could be engaged at any speed over 30 mph (48 km/h). The same year, the company introduced a fifth, transverse shock absorber and made column shift (known as Handishift) available on the 120 and Six.

A new body shape was introduced for the 1941 model year, the Packard Clipper. It was available only as a four-door model on the 127 in (3,226 mm) wheelbase of the 160, but powered by 125 hp (93 kW) version of straight-8 engine used the 120.

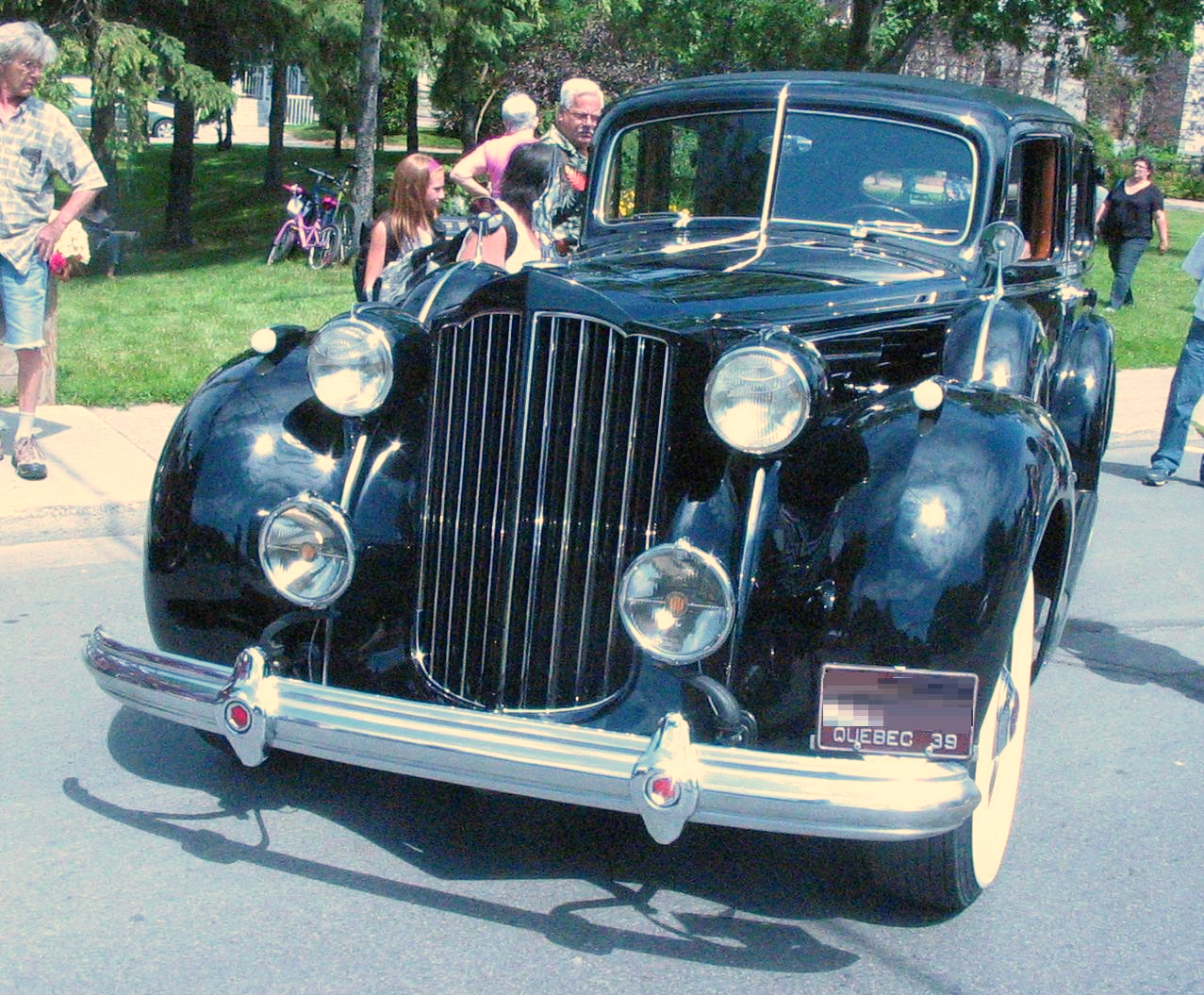
1939 (17th series) Twelve

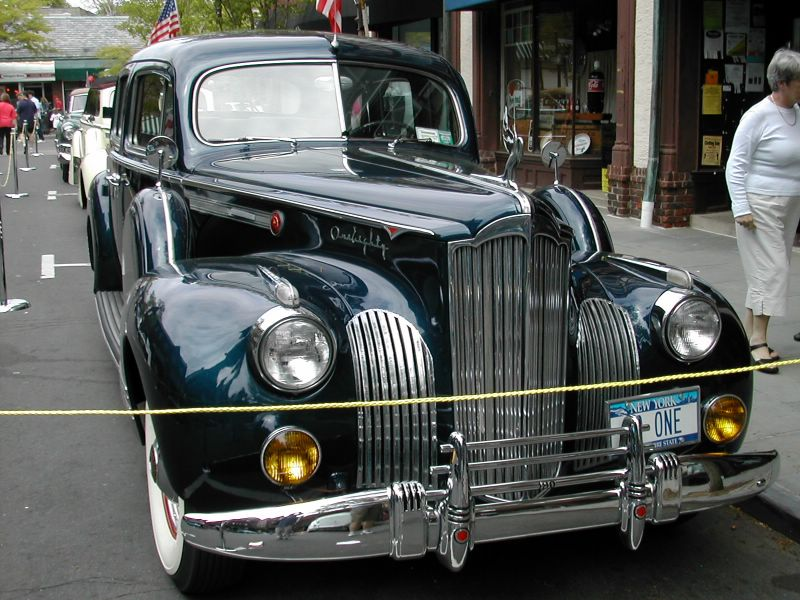
1941 180 Formal Sedan

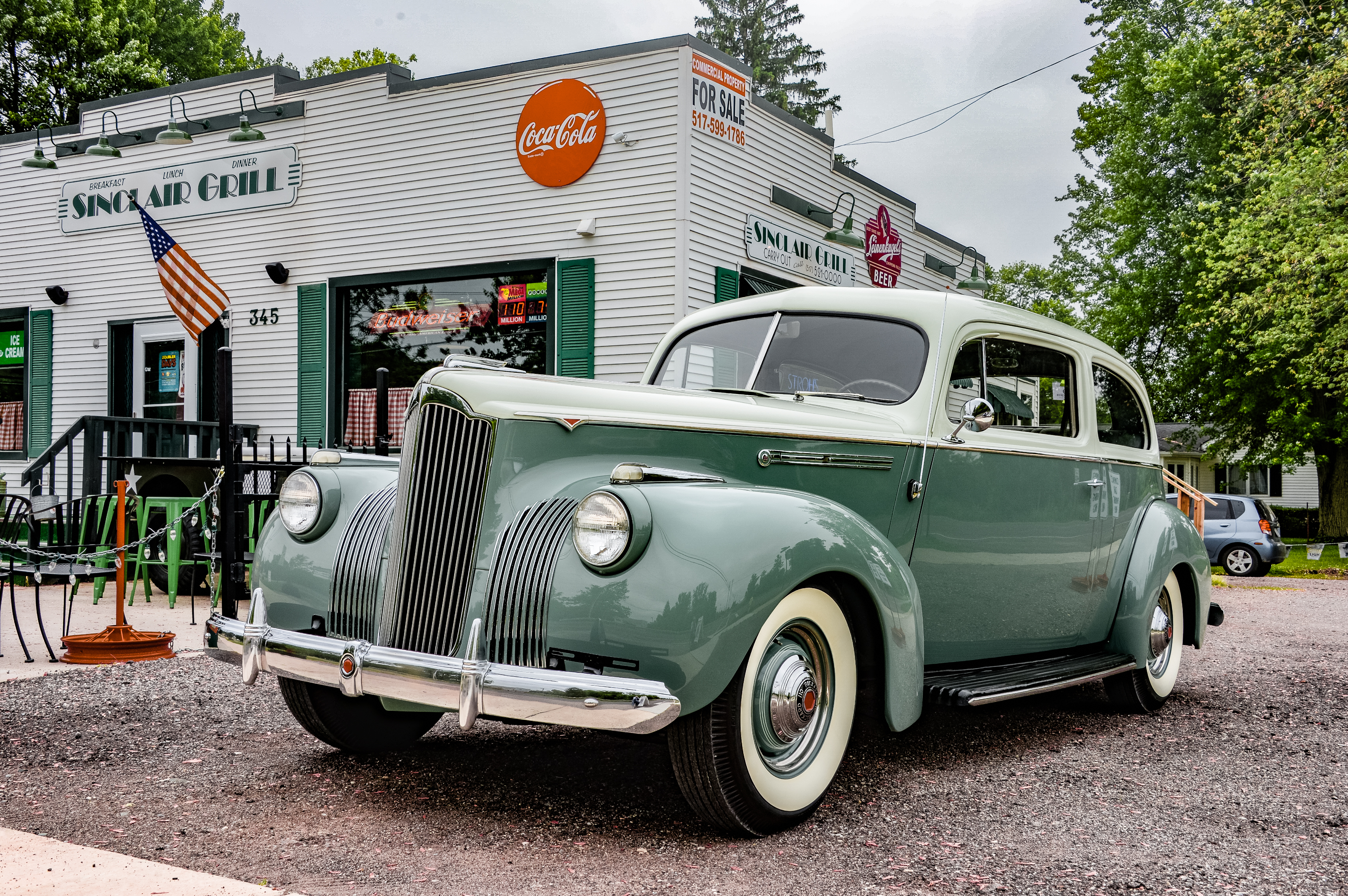
1941 110 2-Door Touring Sedan

=== 1942–1945 ===
In 1942, the Packard Motor Car Company converted to 100% war production. During World War II, Packard again built airplane engines, licensing the Merlin engine from Rolls-Royce as the V-1650, which powered the P-51 Mustang fighter, ironically known as the "Cadillac of the Skies" by GIs in WWII. Packard also built 1350-, 1400-, and 1500-hp V-12 marine engines for American PT boats (each boat used three) and some of Britain's patrol boats. Packard ranked 18th among United States corporations in the value of wartime production contracts.

By the end of the war in Europe, Packard Motor Car Company had produced over 55,000 combat engines. Sales in 1944 were $455,118,600. By May 6, 1945, Packard had a backlog on war orders of $568 million.

=== 1946–1956 ===
By the end of World War II, Packard was in excellent financial condition with assets of around $33 million, but several management mistakes became more apparent with time. Like other US automobile companies, Packard resumed civilian car production in late 1945, labeling them as 1946 models by modestly updating their 1942 models. As only tooling for the Clipper was at hand, the Senior-series cars were not rescheduled. One version of the story is that the Senior dies were left outdoors to rust and were not usable. Another tale is that Roosevelt gave Stalin the dies for the Senior series, but the ZiS-110 state limousines were a separate design.

The Clipper became outdated as the new envelope bodies started appearing, led by Studebaker and Kaiser-Frazer. Although Packard was in good financial condition as the war ended, they had not sold enough cars to pay the cost of tooling for the 1941 design. While most automakers were able to introduce new vehicles for 1948 and 1949, Packard could not until 1951. The company updated cars by adding new sheet metal to the existing body (which added 200 lb (91 kg) of curb weight). Six-cylinder cars were discontinued for the U.S. market, and a convertible was added. These new designs hid their relationship with the Clipper. Even that name was dropped for a while.

The design chosen was a "bathtub" type, commonly called ponton. While this was considered futuristic during the war and the concept was taken further with the 1949 Nash, and survived for decades in the Saab 92–96 in Europe, the 1948–1950 Packard styling was polarizing. To some, it was sleek and blended classic with modern. Others nicknamed it the "pregnant elephant". Test driver for Modern Mechanix, Tom McCahill, referred to the newly designed Packard as "a goat" and "a dowager in a Queen Mary hat" in the January 1948 issue. Packard sold 2,000 vehicles in 1948 and a total of 116,000 of the 1949 models. In the early post-WWII years, the demand for new cars was extremely high, and nearly any vehicle would sell. Attempting to maintain strong sales beyond this point would prove more problematic.

Cadillac's new 1948 cars had sleek, aircraft-inspired styling that immediately made Packard's "bathtub" styling seem old-fashioned. Cadillac also debuted a brand-new OHV V8 engine in 1949 whereas Packard's lack of a modern engine became an increasing liability.

Packard outsold Cadillac until circa 1950; most sales were the midrange volume models. During this time, Cadillac was among the earliest US makers to offer an automatic transmission (the Hydramatic in 1941). Packard caught up with the Ultramatic, offered on top models in 1949 and all models from 1950 onward, but its perceived market reputation now had it as a competitor to Buick.

Designed and built by Packard, the Ultramatic featured a lockup torque converter with two speeds. Early Ultramatics normally operated only in "high", with "low" having to be selected manually. Beginning in late 1954, it could be set to operate only in "high" or to start in "low" and automatically shift into "high". "High" was intended for normal driving and "Low" was mainly for navigating hills.

The Ultramatic made Packard the only American automotive manufacturer other than GM to develop an automatic transmission completely in-house. Ford had chosen to outsource their design to Borg-Warner (Ford had attempted to purchase Ultramatics from Packard to install in Lincolns, but bought Hydramatics until Lincoln developed its own automatic transmission a few years later). Ultramatic did not compare to GM's Hydramatic for smoothness of shifting, acceleration, or reliability. The resources spent on Ultramatic deprived Packard of the opportunity to develop a modern V8 engine. Also, when a new body style was added in addition to standard sedans, coupes, and convertibles, Packard introduced a station wagon instead of a two-door hardtop in response to Cadillac's Coupe DeVille. The Station Sedan, a wagon-like body that was mostly steel, with a good deal of decorative wood in the back. A total of 3,864 were sold over its three years of production. The Packards of the late 1940s and early 1950s were built with traditional craftsmanship and the best materials, but the combination of the lower-priced Packards leading sales and impacting the prestige of their higher-end models and some questionable marketing decisions, Packard's crown as "king" of the luxury car market was at risk. In 1950, sales dropped to 42,000 cars for the model year. When Packard's president George T. Christopher set the course for an evolutionary styling approach with a facelift for 1951, others wanted a radical new design. Christopher resigned and Packard treasurer Hugh Ferry became president and demanded a new direction. Ferry, who had spent his career at Packard in the accounting department, did not want the job and quickly made it clear that he was serving on a temporary basis until a permanent company president could be found.

The 1951 Packards were redesigned. Designer John Reinhart introduced a high-waisted, more squared-off profile fitting the contemporary styling trends — very different from the traditional flowing design of the postwar era. New styling features included a one-piece windshield, a wrap-around rear window, small tailfins on the long-wheelbase models, a full-width grille (replacing the traditional Packard upright design), and blunt "guideline fenders" with the hood and front fenders at the same height. The 122 in (3,099 mm) wheelbase was used on the 200-series standard and Deluxe two- and four-doors, 250-series Mayfair two-door hardtops (Packard's first), and convertibles. The higher-end 300 and Patrician 400 models were built on a 127 in (3,226 mm) wheelbase. The 200-series models were low-end models and now included a business coupe. The new appearance had similarities to Oldsmobiles, which were more moderately priced and sold in greater numbers.

The 250, 300, and 400/Patricians were Packard's flagship models and comprised the majority of the production for that year. The Patrician was now the premium Packard, replacing the Custom Eight line. Original plans were to equip it with a 356 cu in (5.8 L) engine, but the company decided that sales would not be sufficient to justify producing the larger, more expensive engine, and so the de-bored 327 cu in (5.4 L) (previously the middle engine) was used. While the smaller engine offered nearly equal performance in the new Packards to that of the 356, the move was seen by some as further denigrating Packard's image as a luxury car.

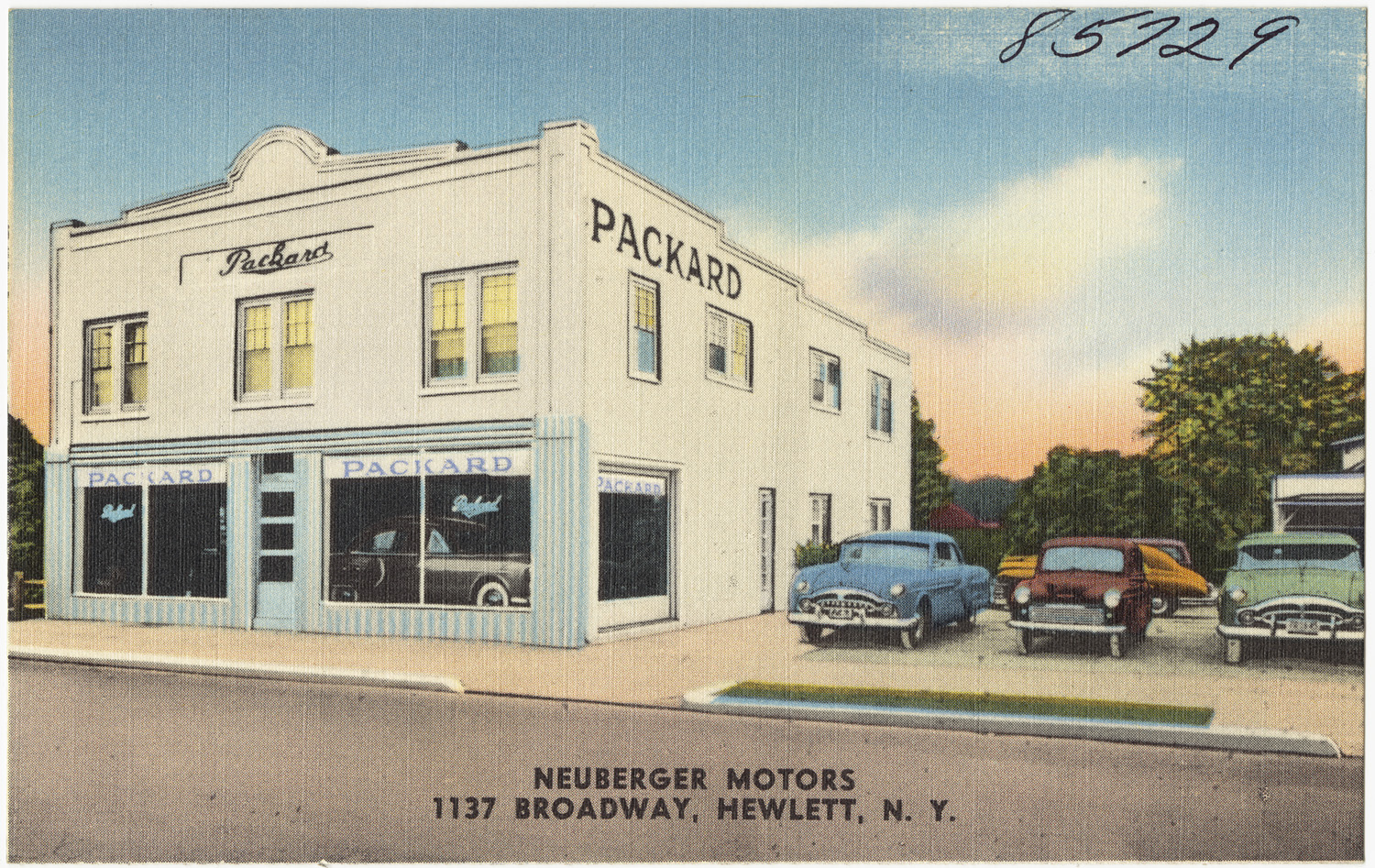
Packard dealer at 1137 Broadway, Hewlett, New York, ca. 1950–1955

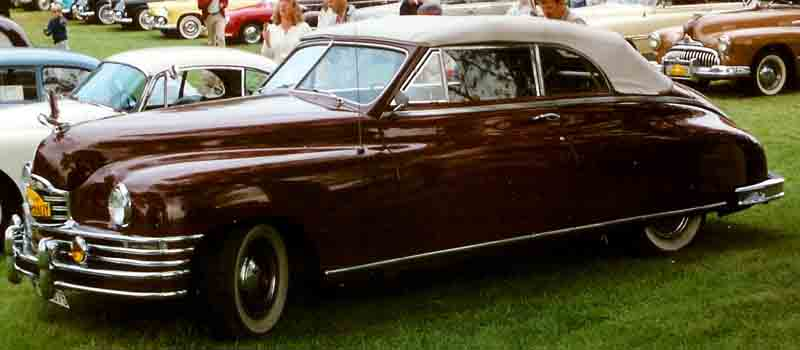
1949 Packard convertible coupé

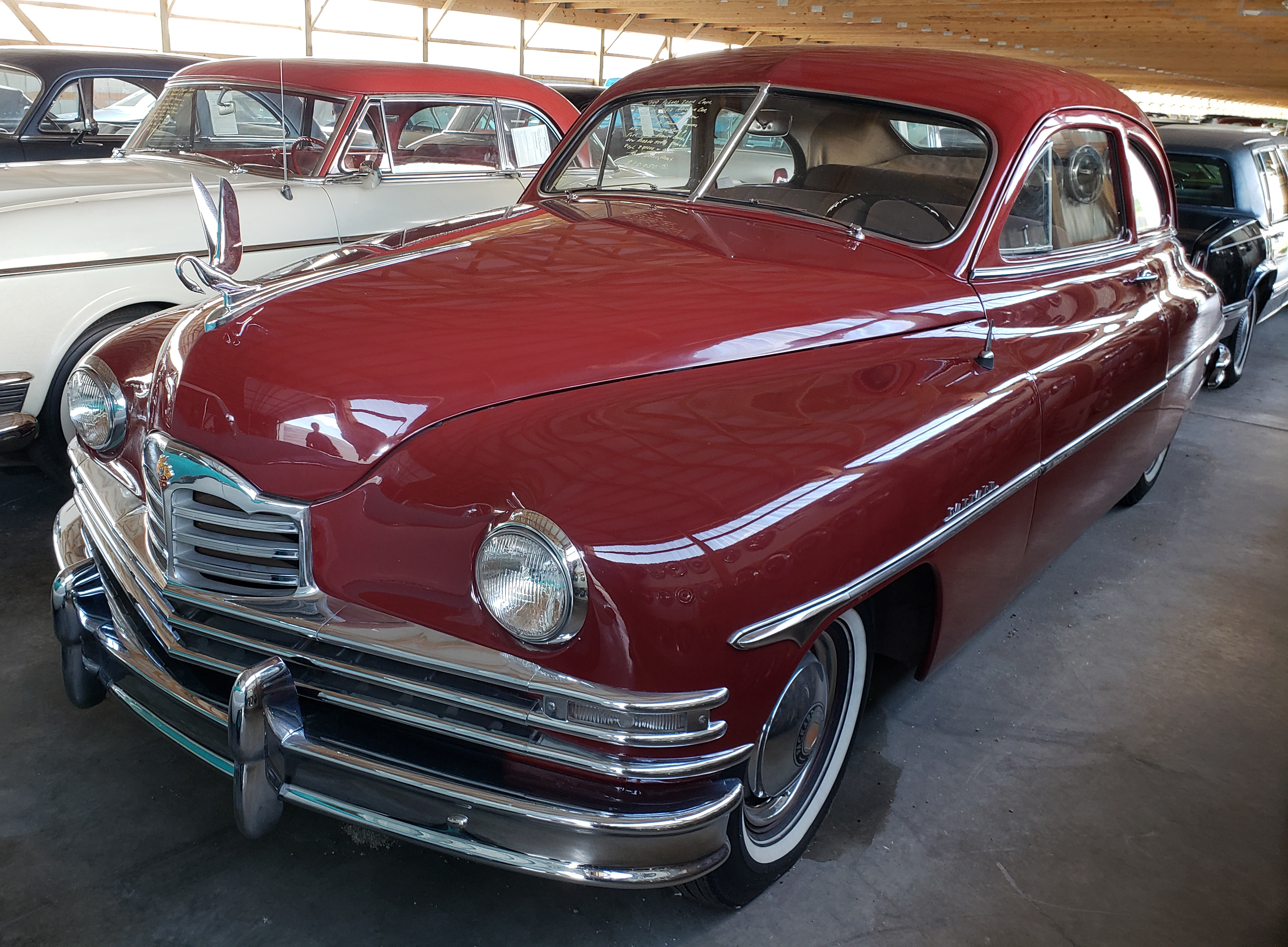
1950 Packard Eight Club Sedan

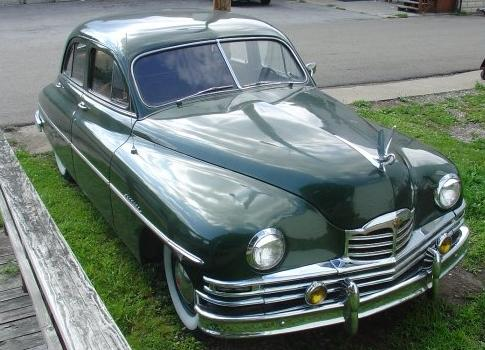
1950 Packard Eight four-door sedan

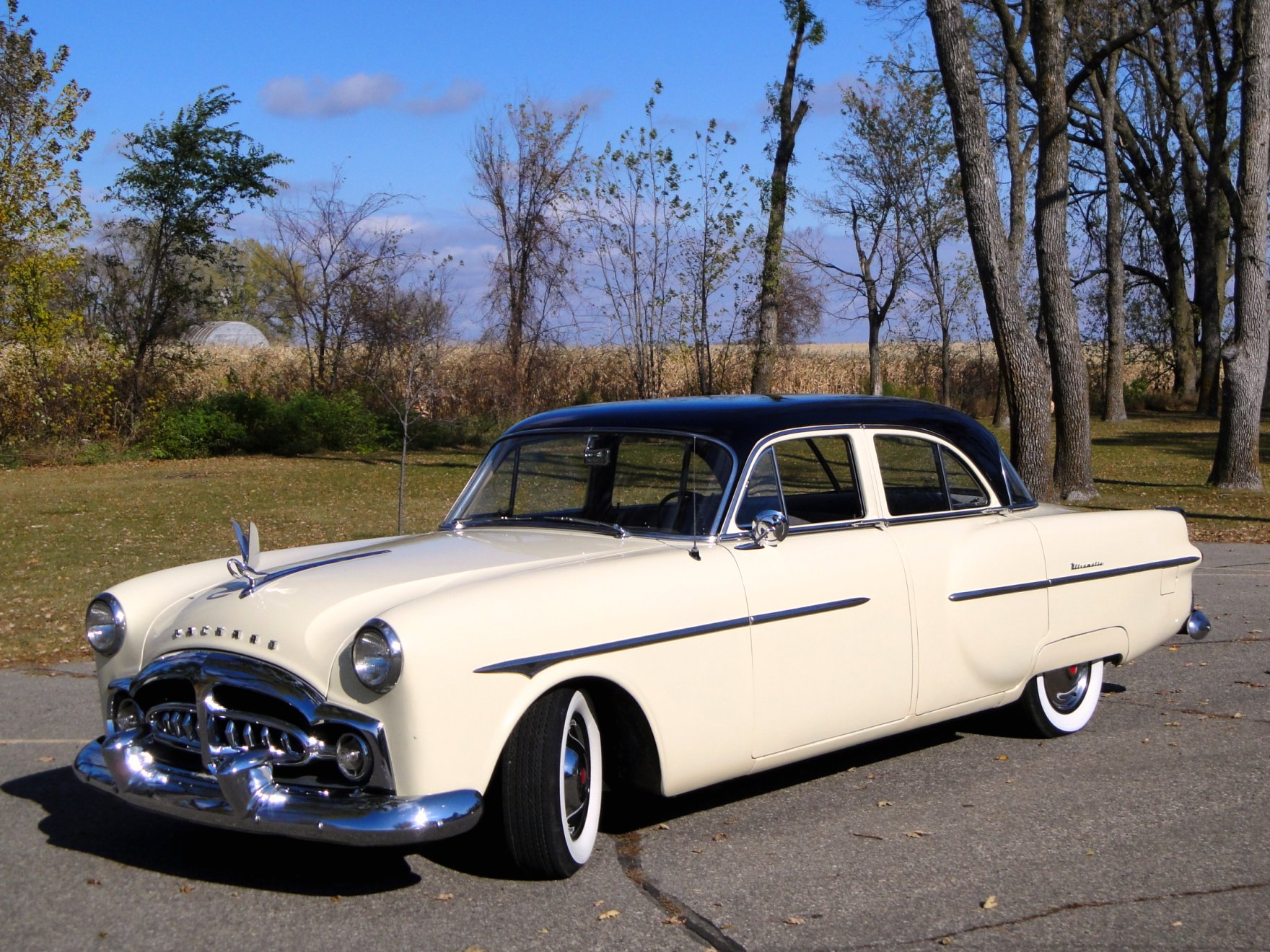
1951 Packard 300

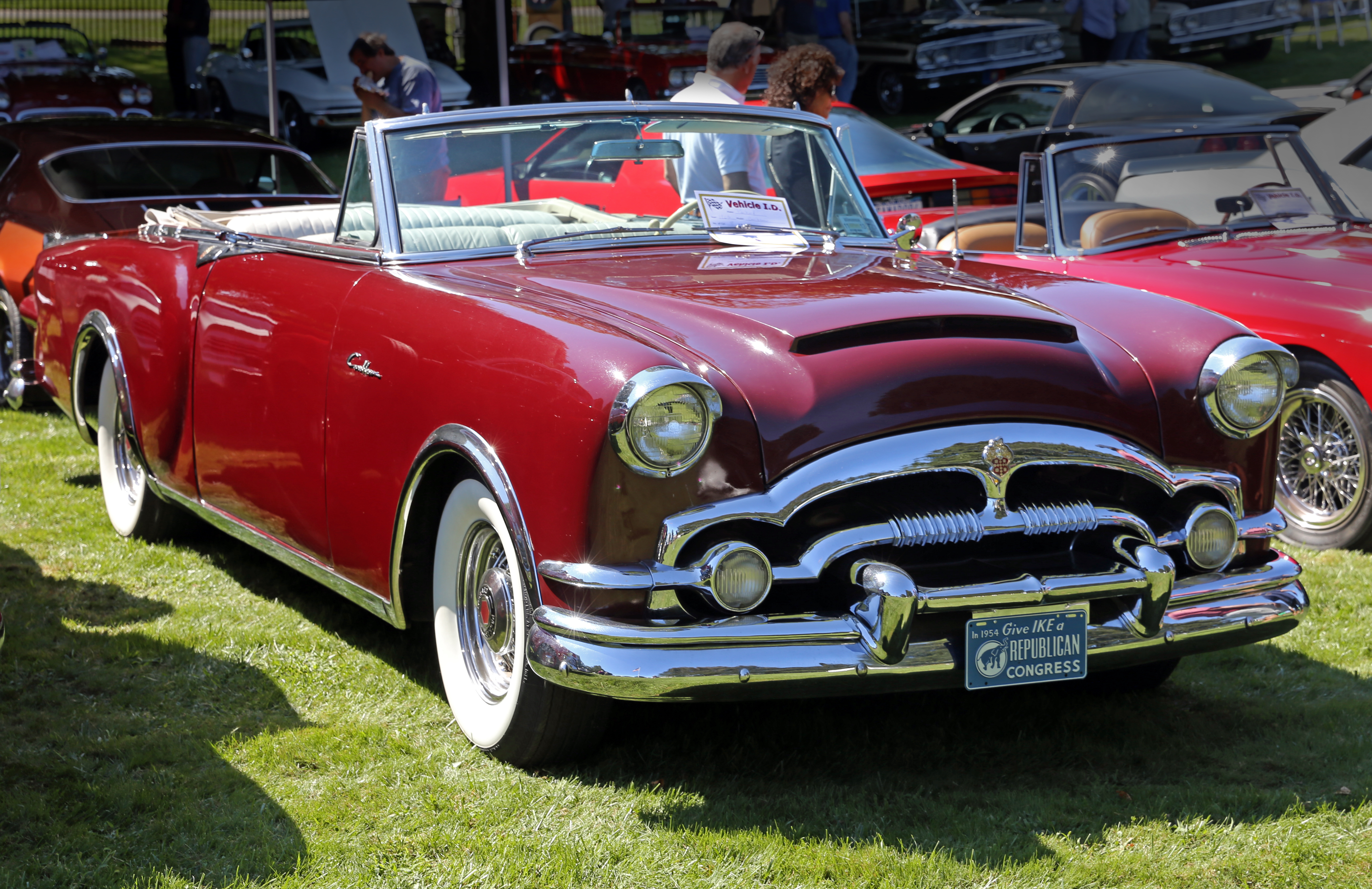
1953 Packard Caribbean convertible

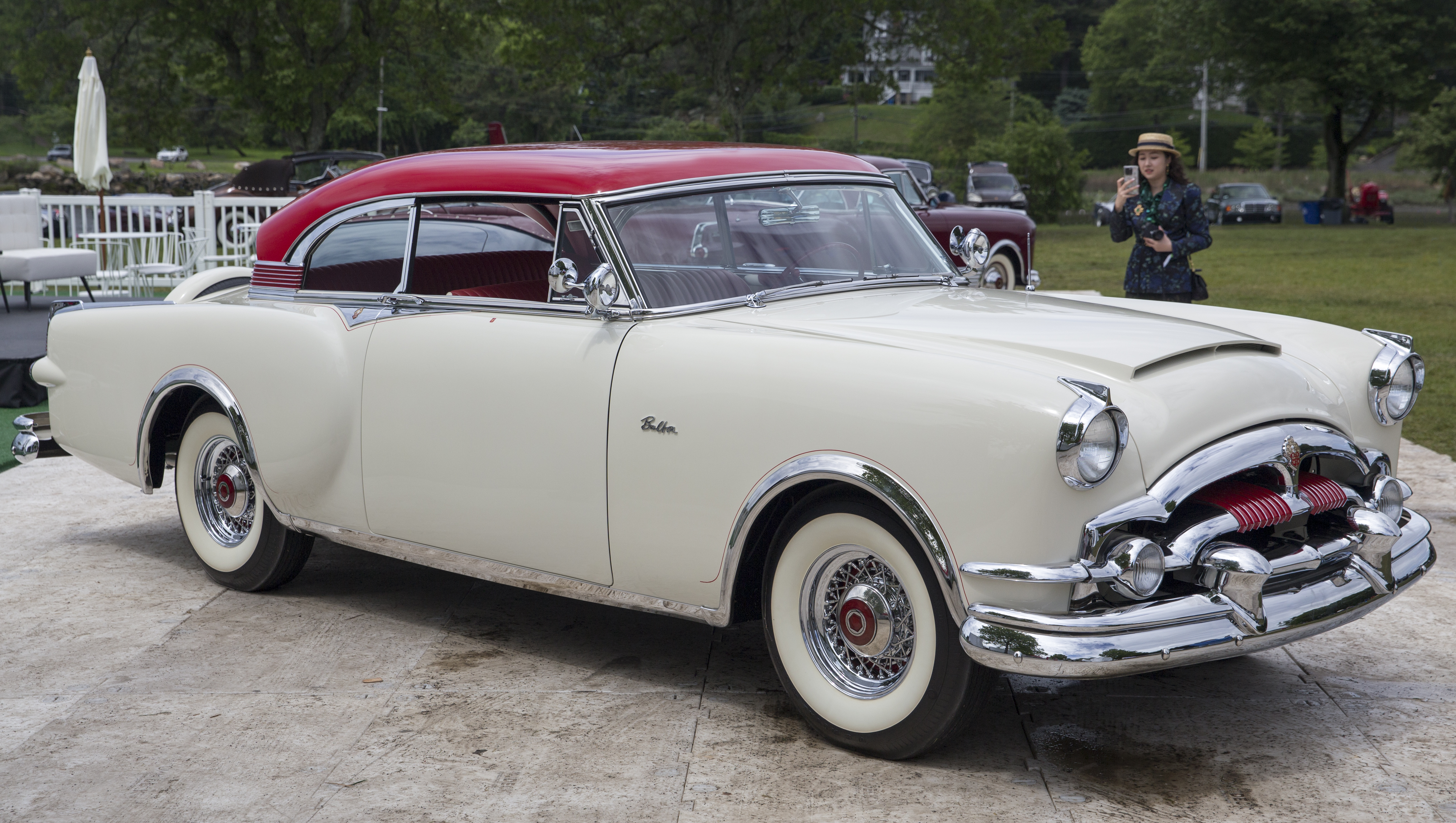
1953 Packard Balboa-X - this hardtop coupe concept did not enter production

Since 1951 offered little new from other manufacturers, Packard's redesigned lineup sold nearly 101,000 cars. The 1951 Packards were a mixture of the modern (automatic transmissions) and old (using flathead inline eights when OHV V8 engines were becoming the norm). No domestic car lines had OHV V8s in 1948, but by 1955, every car line offered a version. The Packard inline eight, despite being an older design that lacked the power of Cadillac's engines, produced no vibration. When combined with an Ultramatic transmission, the drivetrain made for a quiet and smooth experience on the road. Packard could not keep up with the horsepower race, which was increasingly moving to high compression, short-stroke engines capable of sustained driving at speeds above 55 mph (89 km/h).

Packard's image was increasingly seen as dowdy and old-fashioned, unappealing to younger customers. Surveys found that nearly 75% of Packard customers had owned previous Packards and few new buyers were attracted to the make. Compounding this problem was the company's geriatric leadership. The Packard board of directors by the early 1950s had an average age of 67. In 1948, Alvin Macauley, born during the Grant Administration, had stepped down as chairman. Hugh Ferry decided to hire an outsider as president. He recruited James Nance from appliance manufacturer Hotpoint. At 52, Nance was more than a decade younger than the youngest Packard executive.

One reason for the aged leadership of Packard was the company's lack of a pension plan for executives (rank-and-file workers had a pension plan per their United Auto Workers contract). As a result, Packard executives were reluctant to retire with no source of income other than a Social Security payment, thus blocking younger men from coming to power in the company. One of James Nance's first actions as president was creating a pension plan to induce Packard executives to retire. Nance worked to snag Korean War military contracts and turn around Packard's badly diluted image. He declared that Packard would cease producing mid-priced cars and build only luxury models to compete with Cadillac. As part of this strategy, Nance unveiled a low-production (only 750 made) model for 1953, the Caribbean convertible. Competing directly with the other specialty convertibles marketed that year, (Buick Skylark, Oldsmobile 98 Fiesta, Cadillac Eldorado, and Chrysler New Yorker Deluxe), it was equally well-received and outsold its competition. Nevertheless, overall sales declined in 1953. While the limited edition luxury models such as the Caribbean convertible and the Patrician 400 Sedan, and the Derham custom formal sedan brought back some prestige from past Packards, the "high pocket" styling introduced two model years prior was no longer drawing buyers for Packer's volume models. Furthermore, Packard's build quality also began slipping during this period as employee morale decreased.

While American independent manufacturers like Packard did well during the early postwar period, supply had caught up with demand and by the early 1950s they were increasingly challenged as the domestic "Big Three"—General Motors, Ford, and Chrysler—battled intensely for sales in the economy, medium-priced, and luxury markets. Those independents that remained in business in the early 1950s, merged. In 1953, Kaiser merged with Willys to become Kaiser-Willys. Nash and Hudson became American Motors Corporation (AMC). The strategy for these mergers included cutting costs and strengthening their sales organizations to meet the intense competition from the Big Three.

In 1953–54, Ford and GM waged a brutal sales war, cutting prices and forcing cars on dealers. While this had little effect on either company, it damaged independent automakers. Nash's president George W. Mason thus proposed that the four major independents (Nash, Hudson, Packard, and Studebaker) merge into one firm American Motors Corporation (AMC). Mason held informal discussions with Nance to outline his strategic vision, and an agreement was reached for AMC to buy Packard's Ultramatic transmissions and V8 engines. They were used in 1955 Hudsons and Nashes.

It did not help that Chrysler and Ford waged a campaign of "stealing" Packard dealerships during the early 1950s. Consequently, Packard's dealer network became smaller and more scattered which made it even more difficult to sell Packard vehicles.

Although Korean War defense contracts brought in badly needed revenue, the war ended in 1953 and the new Secretary of Defense Charles E. Wilson began cutting defense contracts from all automotive manufacturers other than GM, where he had been president.

Packard's last major development was the Torsion-Level suspension by Bill Allison, dubbed Torsion Level Ride. The front and rear suspensions on each side of the car side are interconnected by a long torsion bar. This design reduced pitching while allowing for low spring rates, which imbued Packards with a ride that was soft yet controlled. Additionally, this suspension featured an electro-mechanical compensator or "levelizer" that kept the car level regardless of passenger or trunk loading.

== Studebaker-Packard Corporation ==
As of October 1, 1954, Packard Motor Car Company bought the failing Studebaker Corporation to form America's fourth-largest automobile company, but without full knowledge of their circumstances or consideration of the financial implications. Studebaker-Packard's Nance refused to consider merging with AMC unless he could take the top command position (Mason and Nance were former competitors as heads of the Kelvinator and Hotpoint appliance companies, respectively), but Mason's grand vision of a Big Four American auto industry ended on October 8, 1954, with his sudden death from acute pancreatitis and pneumonia.

A week after the death of Mason, the new president of AMC, George W. Romney, announced "there are no mergers under way either directly or indirectly". Romney continued with Mason's commitment to buy components from SPC. Although Mason and Nance had previously agreed that SPC would purchase parts from AMC, it did not do so. Packard's engines and transmissions were comparatively expensive, so AMC began development of its own V8 engine, and replaced the outsourced unit by mid-1956. Although Nash and Hudson merged, the four-way merger Mason had hoped for, which would have joined Nash, Hudson, Studebaker, and Packard, did not materialize. The S-P marriage (really a Packard buyout) proved to be a crippling mistake. Although Packard was in fair financial condition, Studebaker was not, struggling with high overhead and production costs and needing the impossible figure of 250,000 cars annually to break even. Due diligence was placed behind "merger fever", and the deal was rushed. It became clear after the merger that Studebaker's deteriorating financial situation put Packard's survival at risk.

Nance had hoped for a total redesign in 1954, but the necessary time and money were lacking. Packard that year (total production 89,796) comprised the bread-and-butter Clipper line (the 250 series was dropped), Mayfair hardtop coupes and convertibles, and a new entry-level long-wheelbase sedan named Cavalier. Among the Clippers was a novelty pillared coupe, the Sportster, styled to resemble a hardtop.

With time and money lacking, 1954 styling was unchanged except for modified headlights and taillights, essentially trim items. A new hardtop named Pacific was added to the flagship Patrician series and all higher-end Packards featured a bored-out 359 cu in (5.9 L) engine. Air conditioning became available for the first time since 1942 although Packard introduced air conditioning in the 1930s. Clippers (which comprised over 80% of production) became available in a hardtop model, Super Panama, but sales fell to 31,000 cars.

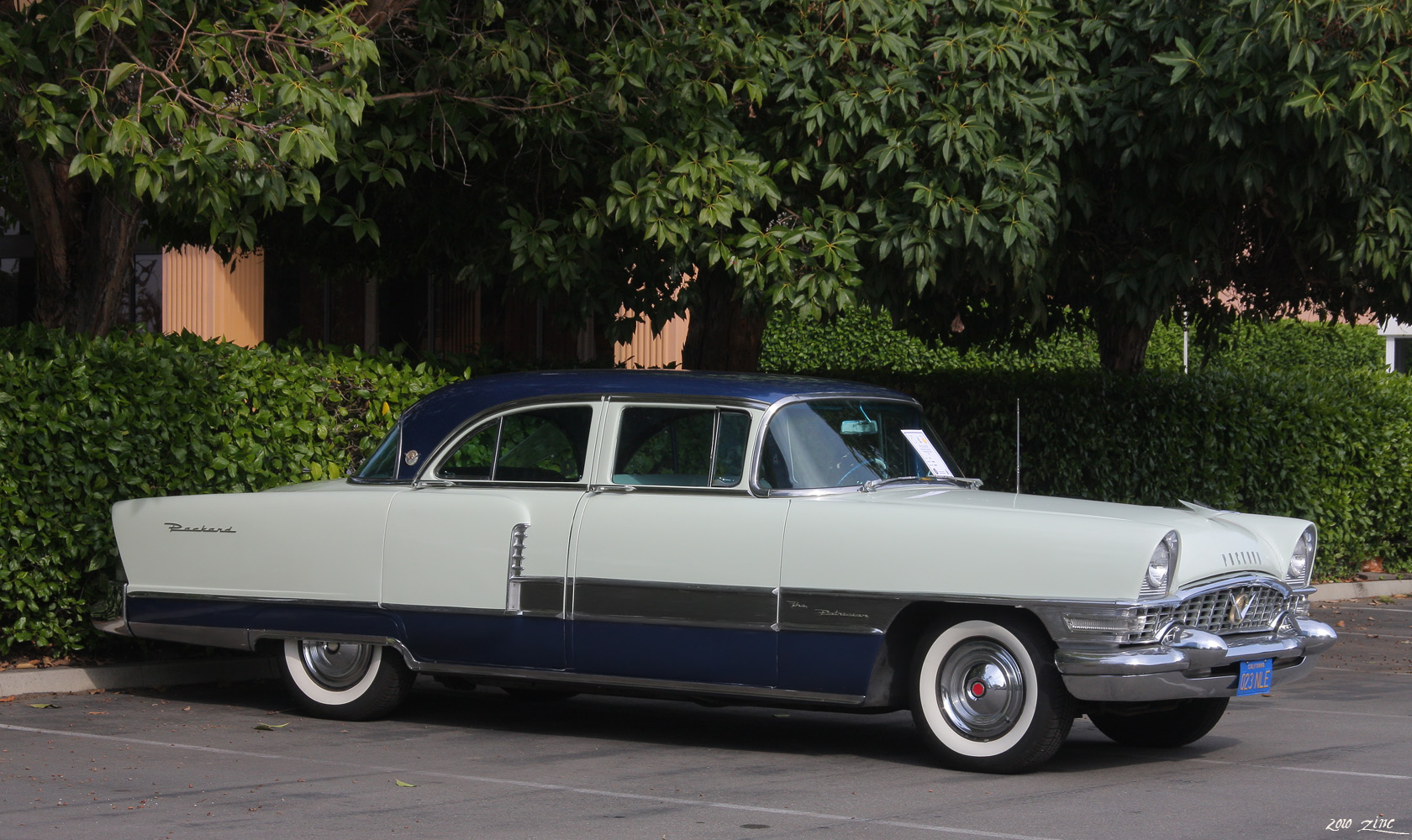
1955 Packard Patrician

The new model Nance hoped for was delayed until 1955, partially because of Packard's merger with Studebaker. Packard stylist Dick Teague was called upon by Nance to design the 1955 line, and to Teague's credit, the 1955 Packard was well received. Not only was the body completely updated and modernized, but the suspension was new, with torsion bars front and rear, along with an electric control that kept the car level regardless of load or road conditions. Along with the new design was Packard's new overhead-valve V8, displacing 352 cu in (5.8 L), replacing the straight-eight that had been used for decades. Packard offered a variety of power, comfort, and convenience features, such as power steering and brakes as well as electric window lifts. Air conditioning was available on all car makes by the mid-1950s, but it was installed on only a handful of cars in 1955 and 1956 despite Packard's status as a luxury car. Model year sales only climbed back to 55,000 units in 1955, including Clipper, in what was a strong year across the industry.

As the 1955 models went into production, an old problem flared up. Back in 1941, Packard had outsourced its bodies to Briggs Manufacturing Company. Briggs founder Walter Briggs had died in early 1952 and his family decided to sell the company to pay estate taxes. Chrysler promptly purchased Briggs and notified Packard that they would cease supplying bodies after Packard's contract with Briggs expired at the end of 1953. Packard then leased from Chrysler one of the former Briggs body plants on Connor Avenue in Detroit. The facility proved too small and caused endless tie-ups and quality problems. Bad quality control hurt the company's image and caused sales to plummet for 1956, though the problems had largely been resolved by that point. Additionally, a "brain drain" of talent away from Packard was underway, including John Z. DeLorean.

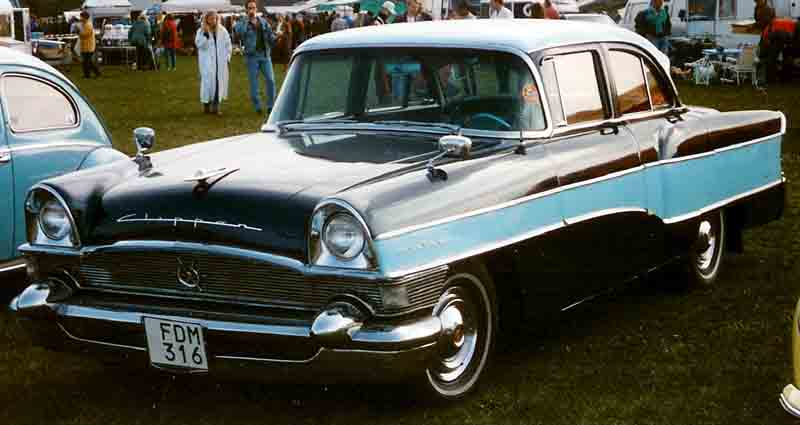
1956 Packard Clipper

For 1956, the Clipper became a separate make, with Clipper Custom and Deluxe models available. Now the Packard-Clipper business model was a mirror to Lincoln-Mercury. "Senior" Packards were built in four body styles, each with a unique model name. Patrician was used for the four-door top-of-the-line sedans, Four Hundred for the hardtop coupes, and the Caribbean for the convertible and vinyl-roof two-door hardtop. In the spring of 1956, the Executive was introduced. In a four-door sedan and a two-door hardtop, the Executive was aimed at the buyer who wanted a luxury car but could not justify Packard's pricing. It was an intermediate model using the Packard name and the Senior models' front end, but using the Clipper platform and rear fenders. This was to some confusion and went against what James Nance had been attempting for several years to accomplish, the separation of the Clipper line from Packard. As late as the cars' introduction to the market was, there was reasoning for in 1957 this car was to be continued. It then became a baseline Packard on the all-new 1957 Senior shell. Clippers would share bodies with Studebaker from 1957.

The new 1955 Packard design did not affect Cadillac's continuing to lead the luxury market segment, followed by Lincoln, Packard, and Imperial. Reliability problems with the automatic transmission and all electrical accessories further eroded the public's opinion of Packard. Sales were good for 1955 compared to the previous year as this was a record year for the automobile industry. Packard's sales fell for 1956 due to the fit and finish of the 1955 models as well as mechanical issues relating to the new engineering features. These defects cost Packard millions in recalls and tarnished its image.

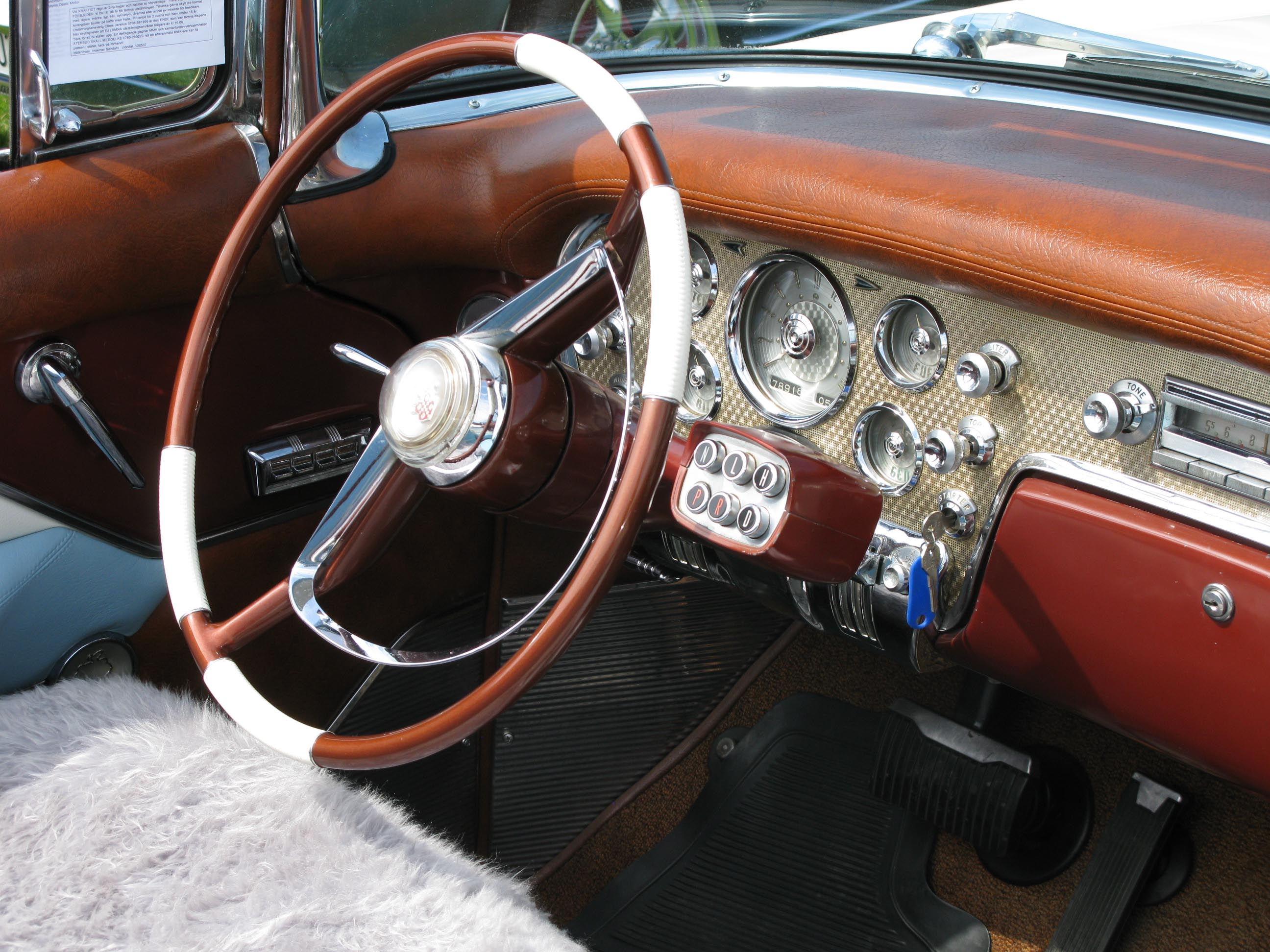
Packard's push-button Ultramatic transmission control pod

For 1956, Teague kept the basic 1955 design and added more styling touches to the body such as then−fashionable three-toning. Headlamps hooded in a more radical style in the front fenders and a slight shuffling of chrome distinguished the 1956 models. "Electronic Push-button Ultramatic", which located transmission push buttons on a stalk on the steering column, proved troublesome, adding to the car's negative reputation, possibly soon to become an orphan. Model series remained the same, but the V8 was now enlarged to 374 cu in (6.1 L) for the Senior series, the largest in the industry. In the top-of-the-line Caribbean, that engine produced 310 hp (230 kW). Clippers continued to use the 352 engine. There were plans for an all−new 1957 line of Senior Packards based on the show car Predictor. Clippers and Studebakers would also share many inner and outer body panels. (A private presentation of this 1957 new-car program was made to Wall Street's investment bankers at the Waldorf-Astoria Hotel in New York in January 1956.) These models were in many ways far advanced from what would be produced by any other automaker at the time, save Chrysler, which soon felt public wrath for its poor quality issues after rushing its all−new 1957 lines into production. Nance was dismissed and moved to Ford as the head of the new Mercury-Edsel-Lincoln division. Although Nance tried everything, the company failed to secure funding for retooling, forcing Packard to share Studebaker platforms and body designs. With no funding to retool for the advanced new models envisioned, Studebaker-Packard's fate was sealed. The large Packard was effectively dead in an executive decision to kill "the car we could not afford to lose". The last fully Packard-designed vehicle, a Patrician four-door sedan, rolled off the Conner Avenue assembly line on June 25, 1956.

=== 1957–1958 ===
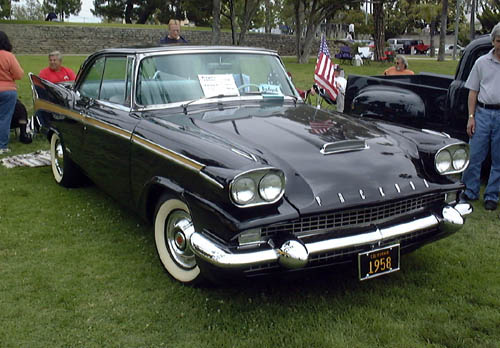
1958 Packard

In 1957, no more Packards were built in Detroit and the Clipper disappeared as a separate brand name. Instead, a Studebaker President–based car bearing the Packard Clipper nameplate appeared on the market, but sales were slow. Available in just two body styles, Town Sedan (four-door sedan) and Country Sedan (four-door station wagon), they were powered by Studebaker's 289 cu in (4.7 L) V8 with a McCulloch supercharger, delivering the same 275 hp (205 kW) as the 1956 Clipper Custom, although at higher revolutions. Borrowing design cues from the 1956 Clipper (visual in the grille and dash), with wheel covers, tail lamps, and dials from 1956 along with the Packard cormorant hood mascot and trunk chrome trim from 1955 senior Packards, front bumpers, and Dagmars from the 1956 model, the 1957 Packard Clipper was much more than a badge-engineered Studebaker—but also far from a Patrician. Had the company been able to invest more money to finish the transformation and position the car under a senior line of "true Packards", it might have been a successful Clipper. Standing alone the cars sold in limited numbers; a number of Packard dealers dropped their franchises while customers stayed away, despite huge price discounts, fearful of buying a car that could soon be an orphan. Additionally, there was internal competition from Studebaker-Packard dealers that also carried the Mercedes-Benz brand, to which SP had the USA rights, with the market flooded by inexpensive cars, minor automakers struggled to sell vehicles at loss leader prices to keep up with Ford and GM. There was a general decline in demand for large cars heralded an industry switch to compact cars such as the Studebaker Lark.

The marque suffered further loss of exclusivity and consumers perceived a reduction in quality. Competitors and media critics described the new models as "Packardbakers". The 1958 models were launched with no series name, simply as "Packard". New body styles were introduced, and a two-door hardtop joined the four-door sedan. A new premier model appeared with a sporting profile: the Packard Hawk was based on the Studebaker Golden Hawk and featured a new nose and a fake spare wheel molded in the trunk lid reminiscent of the concurrent Imperial. The 1958 Packards were among the first in the industry to be "facelifted" with plastic parts. The housing for the new dual headlights and the complete fins were fiberglass parts grafted on Studebaker bodies. Very little chrome was on the lower front clip. Designer Duncan McRae managed to include the 1956 Clipper tail lights for one last time which also included the "Packard Cusps" in the front hood. Added to the front of all but the Hawk were jet nacelles for quad headlights, in a desperate attempt to keep up with late-1950s styling cues. All Packards were equipped with 14 in (36 cm) road wheels to lower the profile. The public reaction was predictable and sales were 2,622 vehicles for the 1958 model year, even being outsold by Checker Motors Corp. The Studebaker factory was older than Packard's Detroit plant, with higher production requirements, which added to dipping sales. A new compact car on which the company staked its survival, the Lark, was a year away, and it also failed to sell in sufficient numbers to keep the marque afloat. Several makes were discontinued around this time: Packard, Edsel, Hudson, Nash, DeSoto, and Kaiser. Not since the 1930s had so many makes disappeared, and it would not be until the automotive industry crisis of 2008–10 that so many makes would be dropped at the same time again. The last Packard by Studebaker Packard Corporation rolled off the assembly line on July 16, 1958.

=== Concept Packards ===
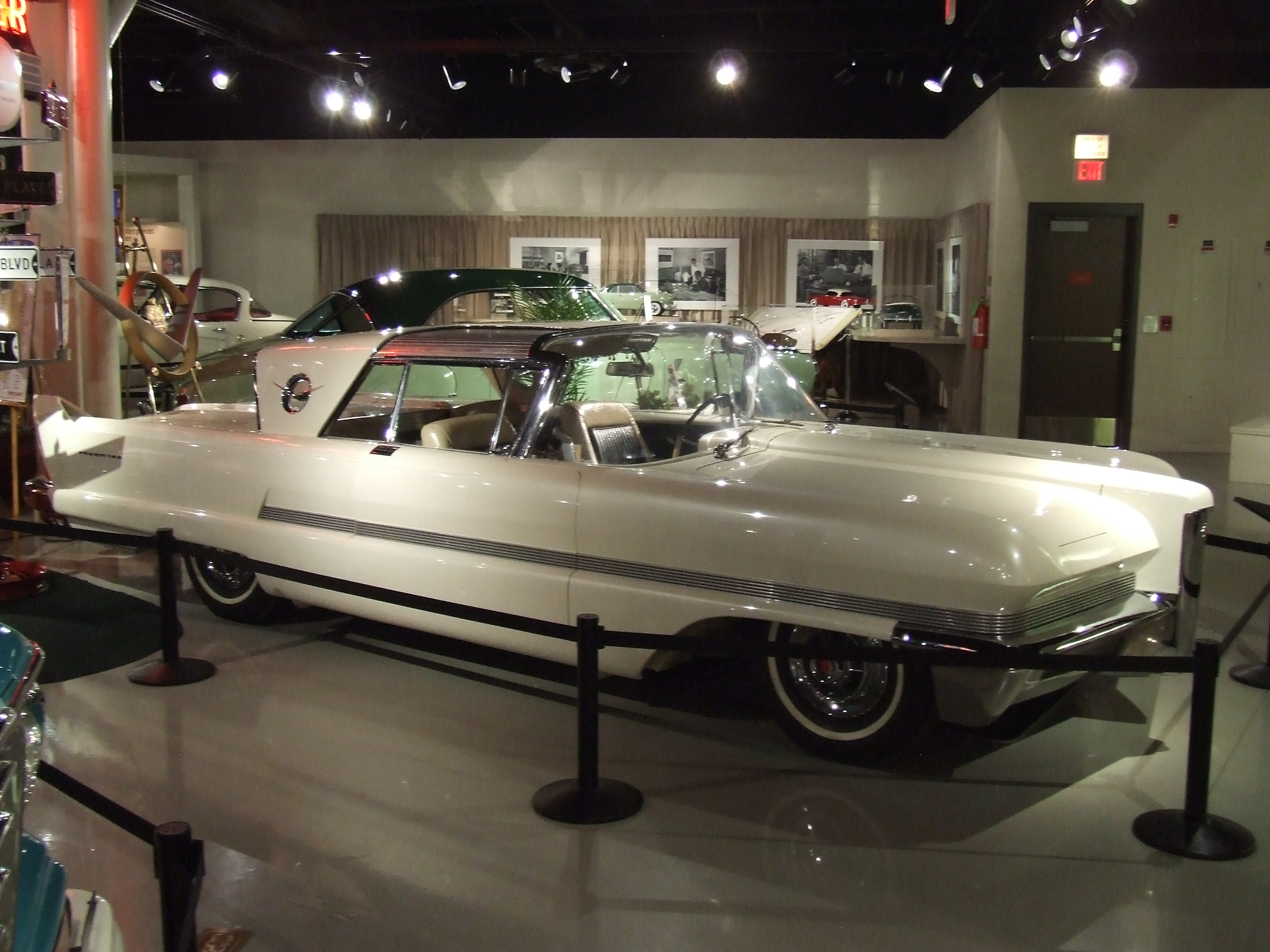
1956 Predictor concept, at the Studebaker National Museum

During the 1950s, a number of "dream cars" were built by Packard in an attempt to keep the marque alive in the imaginations of the American car-buying public. Included in this category are the 1952 Pan American that led to the production Caribbean and the Panther (also known as Daytona), based on a 1954 platform. Shortly after the introduction of the Caribbean, Packard showed a prototype hardtop called the Balboa. It featured a reverse-slanted rear window that could be lowered for ventilation, a feature introduced in a production car by Mercury in 1957 and still in production in 1966.

The Request was based on the 1955 Four Hundred hardtop, but featured a classic upright Packard fluted grille reminiscent of the prewar models. In addition, the 1957 engineering mule "Black Bess" was built to test new features for a future car. This car had a resemblance to the 1958 Edsel. It featured Packard's return to a vertical grill. This grill was very narrow with the familiar ox-yoke shape that was characteristic for Packard, and with front fenders with dual headlights resembling Chrysler products from that era. The engineering mule Black Bess was destroyed by the company shortly after the Packard plant was shuttered. Of the 10 Requests built, only four were sold off the showroom floor.

Dick Teague also designed the last Packard show car, the Predictor. This hardtop coupe's design followed the lines of the planned 1957 cars. It had many unusual features, among them a roof section that opened either by opening a door or activating a switch, well ahead of later T-tops. The car had seats that rotated out, allowing the passenger easy access, a feature later used on some Chrysler and GM products. The Predictor also had the opera windows, or portholes, found on concurrent Thunderbirds. Other novel ideas were overhead switches—these were in the production Avanti—and a dash design that followed the hood profile, centering dials in the center console area. This feature has only recently been used on production cars. The Predictor survives and is on display at the Studebaker National Museum section of the Center for History in South Bend, Indiana.

==== Astral ====
One unusual prototype, the Studebaker-Packard Astral, was made in 1957 and first unveiled at the South Bend Art Centre on January 12, 1958, and then at the March 1958 Geneva Motor Show. It had a single gyroscopic balanced wheel and the publicity data suggested it could be nuclear powered or have what the designers described as an ionic engine. No working prototype was ever made, nor was it likely that one was ever intended.

The Astral was designed by Edward E. Herrmann, Studebaker-Packard's director of interior design, as a project to give his team experience in working with glass-reinforced plastic. It was shown at Studebaker dealerships before being put into storage. Rediscovered 30 years later, the car was restored and put on display by the Studebaker museum.

=== The end ===
Studebaker-Packard retired the Packard marque in 1959. In 1962, "Packard" was dropped off the corporation's name at a time when it was introducing the all-new Avanti. The Packard name had been considered for the Avanti, but a less anachronistic image was being sought for the new model. Thus the Packard name ceased to exist in the American auto industry.

In the late 1950s, Studebaker-Packard was approached by enthusiasts to rebadge the French car maker Facel Vega's Excellence four-door hardtop as a Packard for sale in North America, using stock Packard V8s and identifying trim including red hexagonal wheel covers, cormorant hood ornament, and classic vertical ox-yoke grille. The proposition was rejected when Daimler-Benz threatened to pull out of its 1957 marketing and distribution agreement, which would have cost Studebaker-Packard more in revenue than they could have made from the badge-engineered Packard. Daimler-Benz had little of its own dealer network at the time and used this agreement to enter and become more established in the American market through SPC's dealer network, and felt this car was a threat to their models.

=== Aborted revival ===
In the late 1990s, Roy Gullickson revived the Packard nameplate by buying the naming rights and logo and developing a Packard Twelve for the 1999 model year. His goal was an annual production of 2,000 cars, but a lack of investment funds stalled that plan indefinitely. The only prototype Twelve made was sold at an auto auction in Plymouth, MI, in July 2014 for $143,000.

== Packard engines ==
=== Automobile ===
Packard's engineering staff designed and built excellent, reliable engines. Packard offered a 12-cylinder engine—the "Twin Six"—as well as a low-compression straight-eight, but never a 16-cylinder engine. After WWII, Packard continued with their successful straight-eight-cylinder flathead engines. While as fast as the new GM and Chrysler OHV V8s, they were perceived as obsolete by buyers. By waiting until 1955, Packard was almost the last U.S. automaker to introduce a high-compression V8 engine. The design was physically large and entirely conventional, copying many of the first-generation Cadillac, Buick, Oldsmobile, Pontiac, and Studebaker Kettering features. It was produced in 320 cu in (5.2 L) and 352 cu in (5.8 L) displacements. The Caribbean version had two four-barrel carburetors and produced 275 hp (205 kW). For 1956, a 374 cu in (6.1 L) version was used in the Senior cars and the Caribbean two four-barrels produced 305 hp (227 kW).

=== Other Packard engines ===
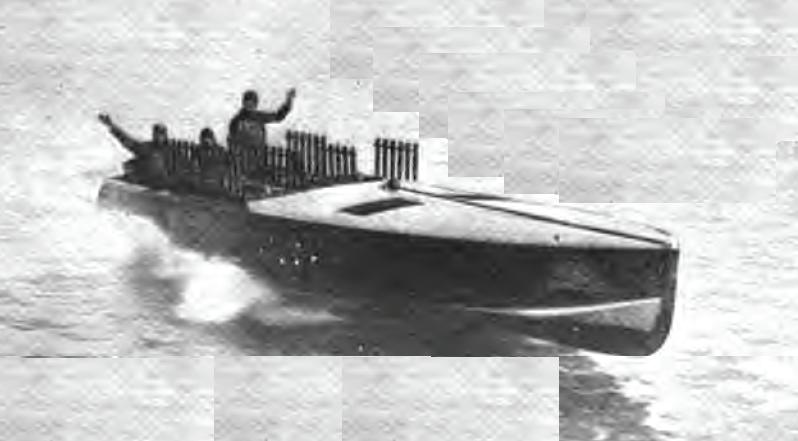
Gar Wood's Miss America 2, winner of the 1921 Harmsworth Trophy, was powered by four Packard-built Liberty L-12 engines.

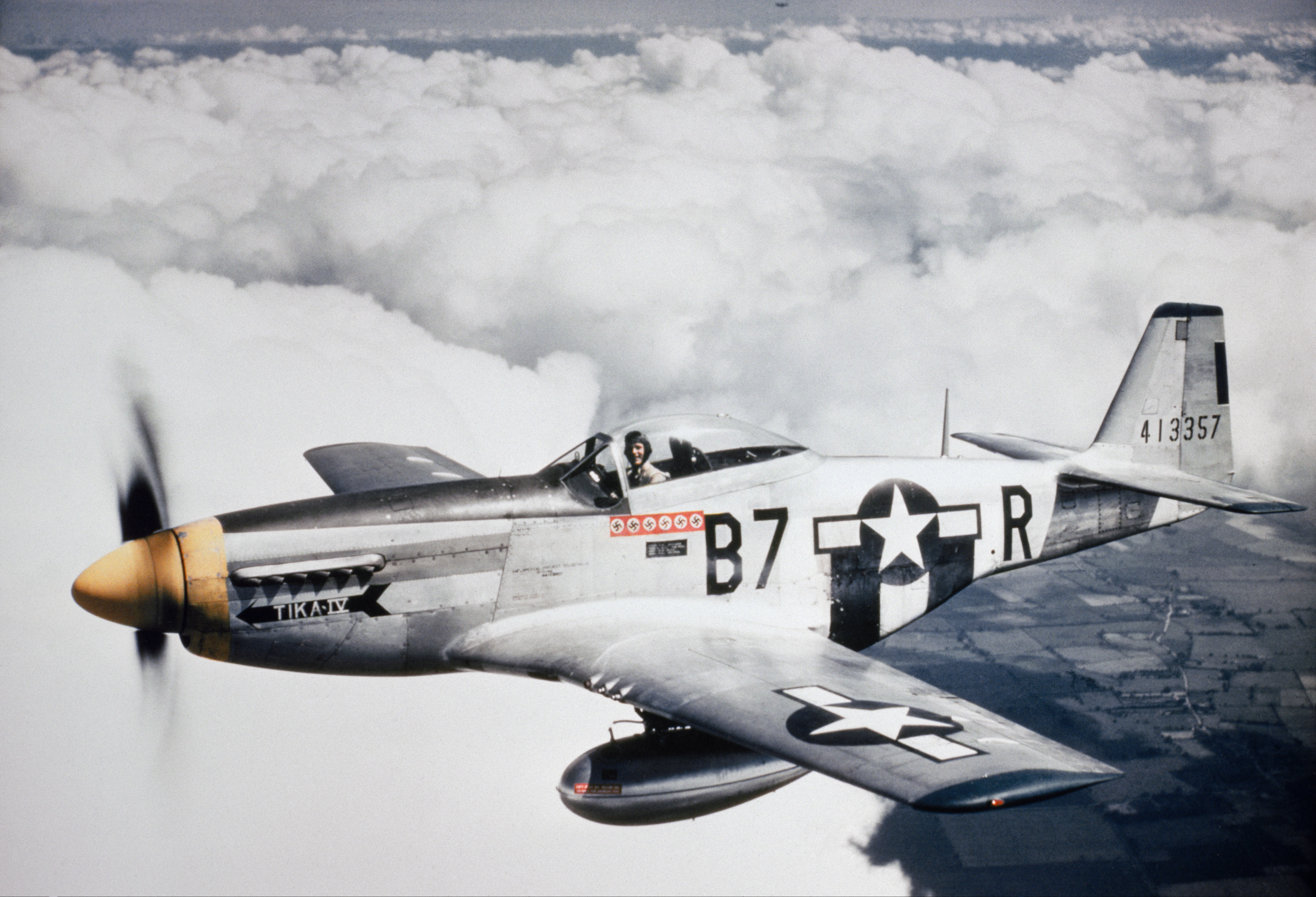
Later variants of the North American P-51 Mustang were powered by a Packard V-1650 Merlin, a license-built version of the Rolls-Royce Merlin.

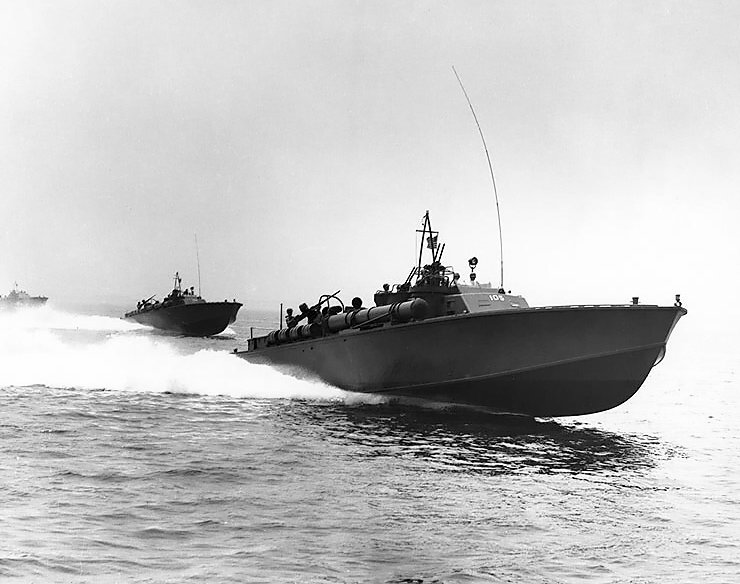
PT boats were powered by a trio of Packard 4M-2500 engines, and later models featured the improved 5M-2500.

Packard also made large aeronautical and marine engines. Chief engineer Jesse G. Vincent developed a V12 airplane engine called the "Liberty engine" that was used widely in Entente air corps during World War I. After the war the Liberty was adapted for marine use, becoming a multiple world record setter under inventor and boating pioneer Gar Wood from the late 1910s through the 1930s.

In the interbellum, Packard built one of the world's first diesel aviation engines, the 225-hp DR-980 radial. It powered the Stinson SM-8D, among others. It also powered a Bellanca CH-300 on a record endurance flight of over 84 hours, a mark that stood for more than 50 years. Other Packard-powered airplanes set several records during the 1920s.

During WWII, Packard license-built Rolls-Royce Merlin engines under the Packard V-1650 designation, used with great success in the famed P-51 Mustang fighter. A marine version of the successor to the V12 Liberty was adapted in three versions – M3-2500, M4-2500, and M5-2500 – to power the war's iconic PT boats.

After WWII, Packard produced a new line of flathead design six (model 1M-245) and eight (model 1M-356) cylinder marine engines based on the automobile versions and the experience gained from the war production. Of the 1M-245 type engines, only 1,865 were produced between Spring 1947 and January 1951, with only a handful of survivors. Of the 1M-356 type engines, approximately 1,525 were produced between 1947 and 1950. Even more rare is the experimental "R" type racing versions (1M-245 "R"), of which only 10 were produced with currently only one known survivor, a 1M-245 R six-cylinder engine powering today a 1936 Gar Wood Speedster.

Packard also developed two turbine aircraft engines for the US Air Force, the XJ41 and XJ49. This was one reason for the Curtiss-Wright take-over in 1956, Packard wanted to sell their own jet.

== Packard automobile models ==
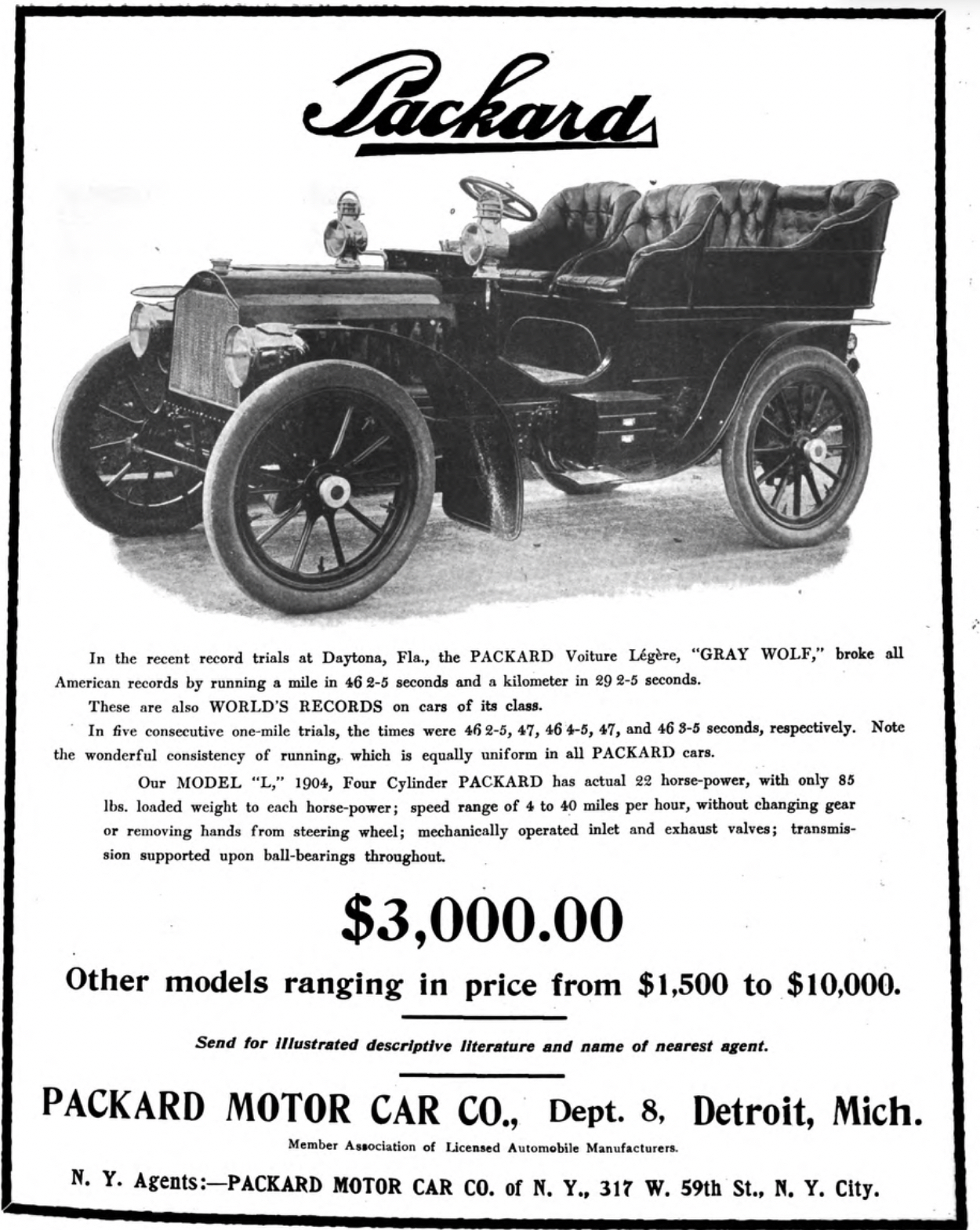
Packard Model L (1904)

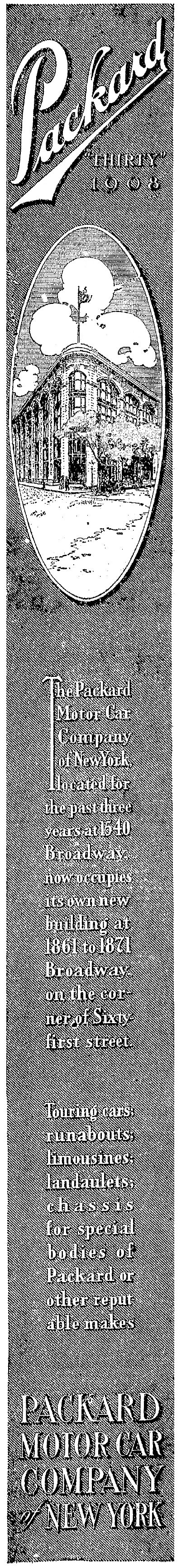
1907 ad in The New York Times

- Packard single-cylinder models:
  - Packard Model A (1899–1900)
  - Packard Model B (1900)
  - Packard Model C (1901)
  - Packard Model E (1901)
  - Packard Model F (1901–1903)
  - Packard Model M (1904)
- Packard twin-cylinder model:
  - Packard Model G (1902)
- Packard four-cylinder models:
  - Packard Model K (1903)
  - Packard Model K Gray Wolf (1903)
  - Packard Model L (1904)
  - Packard Model N (1905) ·
  - Packard Model 24 (Series S) (1906)
  - Packard Model 18 (Series NA-NC) (1905–1907) · (1909–1912)
  - Packard Model 30 (Series U) (1907–1912)
  - Packard Three Ton Truck (1909–)
- Packard six-cylinder models:
  - Packard Dominant Six (1912–1915)
  - Packard Single Six (1921–1924)
  - Packard Six (1925–1929)
  - Packard One-Ten
  - Packard 115 (1937)
  - Packard Six (1937–1949)
- Packard Eight
  - Packard Single Eight & Eight (1924-)
  - Packard Custom Eight
  - Packard Light Eight
  - Packard One-Twenty (1935–1942)
  - Packard 160
  - Packard 180
  - Packard Super Eight
- Packard V-12:
  - Packard Twin Six (1916–1923)
  - Packard 905 (1916–1923)
  - Packard Twin Six (1932)
  - Packard Twelve (1932–1939)
- Postwar Packards (including Clipper)
  - Packard 400, see Packard Four Hundred
  - Packard Caribbean
  - Packard Cavalier
  - Packard Clipper
  - Packard Clipper Constellation
  - Packard 200
  - Packard 250, see Packard 200
  - Packard 300
  - Packard Executive
  - Packard Four Hundred
  - Packard Hawk (1958)
  - Packard Mayfair
  - Packard Pacific
  - Packard Patrician (including Patrician 400)
  - Packard Station Sedan (1949–1950)
  - Packard Super Panama
  - 1957 and 1958 Packards

== Packard show cars ==
- Packard Phantom (1944; also called Brown Bomber and Macauley's Folly)
- Packard Pan-American (1951; also called Macauley Speedster after Packard design executive Edward Macauley)
- Packard Pan-American (1952) and Panther-Daytona
- Packard Balboa (1953)
- Packard Panther (1954–1955)
- Packard Request (1955)
- Packard Predictor (1956)
- Packard Black Bess (1957; not an official name, it was a driveable design proposal)

== Packard tradenames ==
- Ultramatic, Packard's self-developed automatic transmission (1949–1953; Gear-Start Ultramatic 1954, Twin Ultramatic 1955–1956)
- Thunderbolt, a line of Packard Straight Eights after WW2
- Finger Tip Shift, similar to the Chris-O-Matic shift, a servo and remote control to shift the marine engine transmissions (1947–1951)
- Torsion Level Ride, Packard's torsion bar suspension with integrated levelizer (1955–1956)
- Easamatic, Packard's name for the Bendix TreadleVac power brakes available after 1952
- Electromatic, Packard's name for its electrically controlled, vacuum-operated automatic clutch
- Twin Traction, Packard's optional limited-slip rear axle; the first on a production car worldwide (1956–1958)
- Touch Button, Packard's electric panel to control 1956 Twin Ultramatic

== Advertisements ==
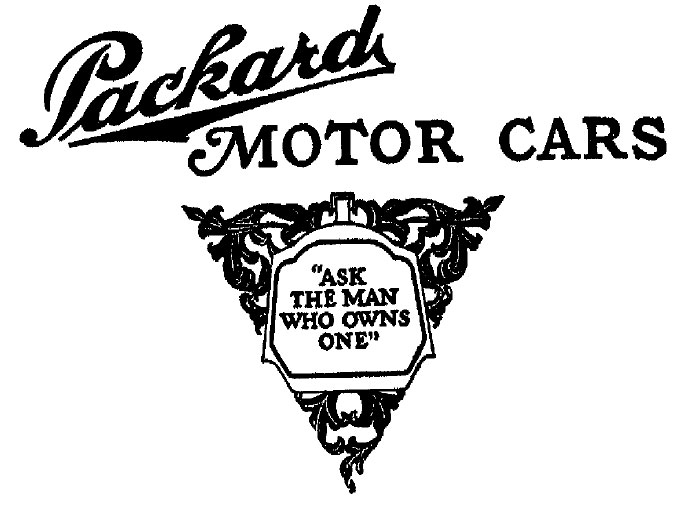
1910

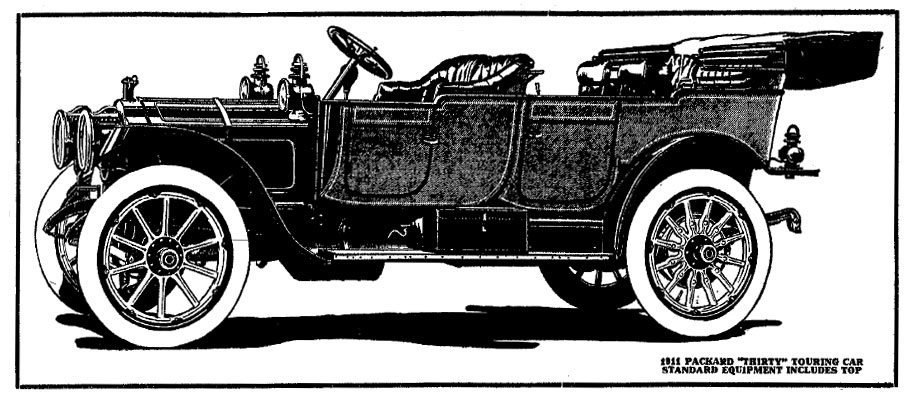
1910 Indianapolis Star

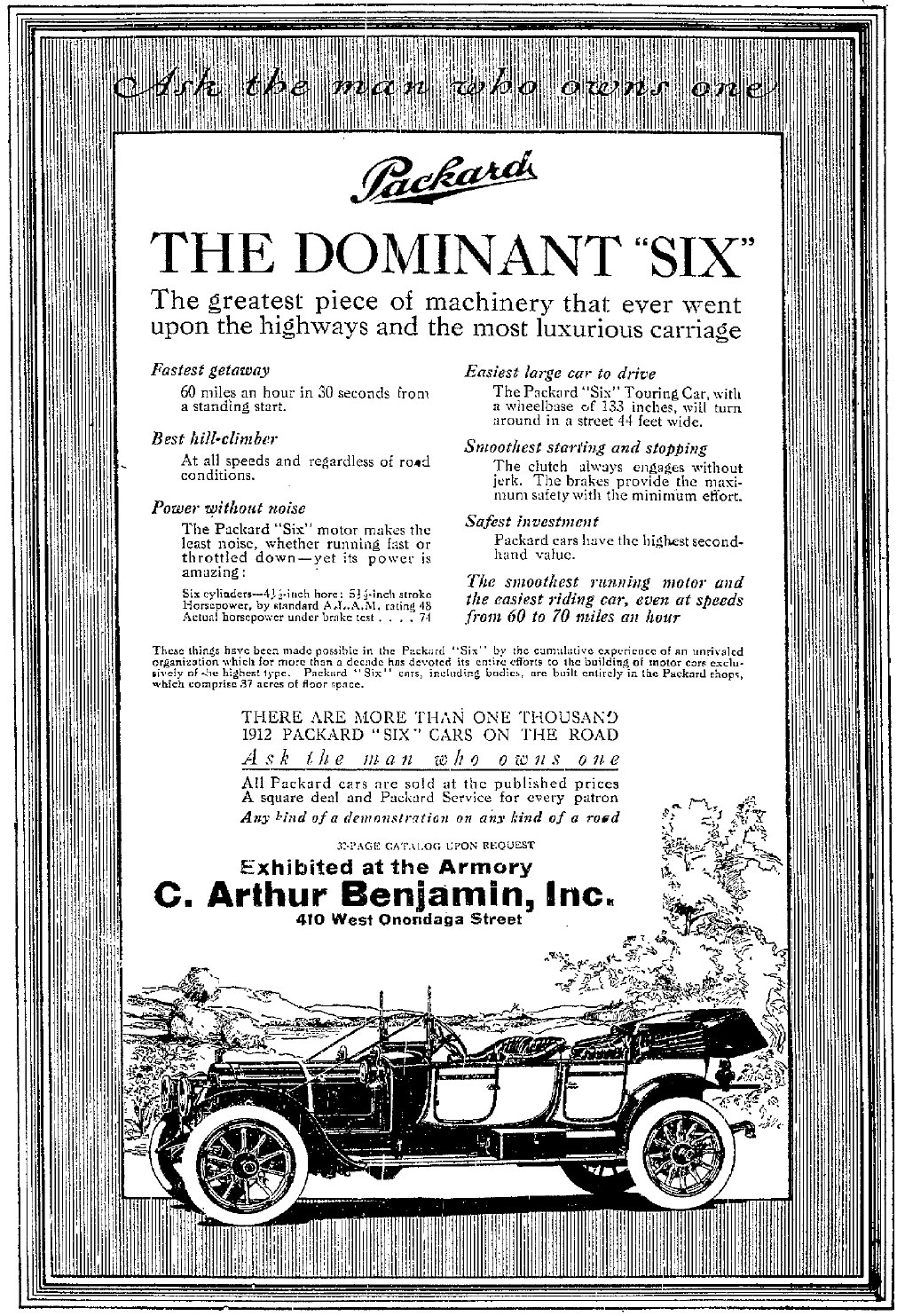
1912 Syracuse Herald

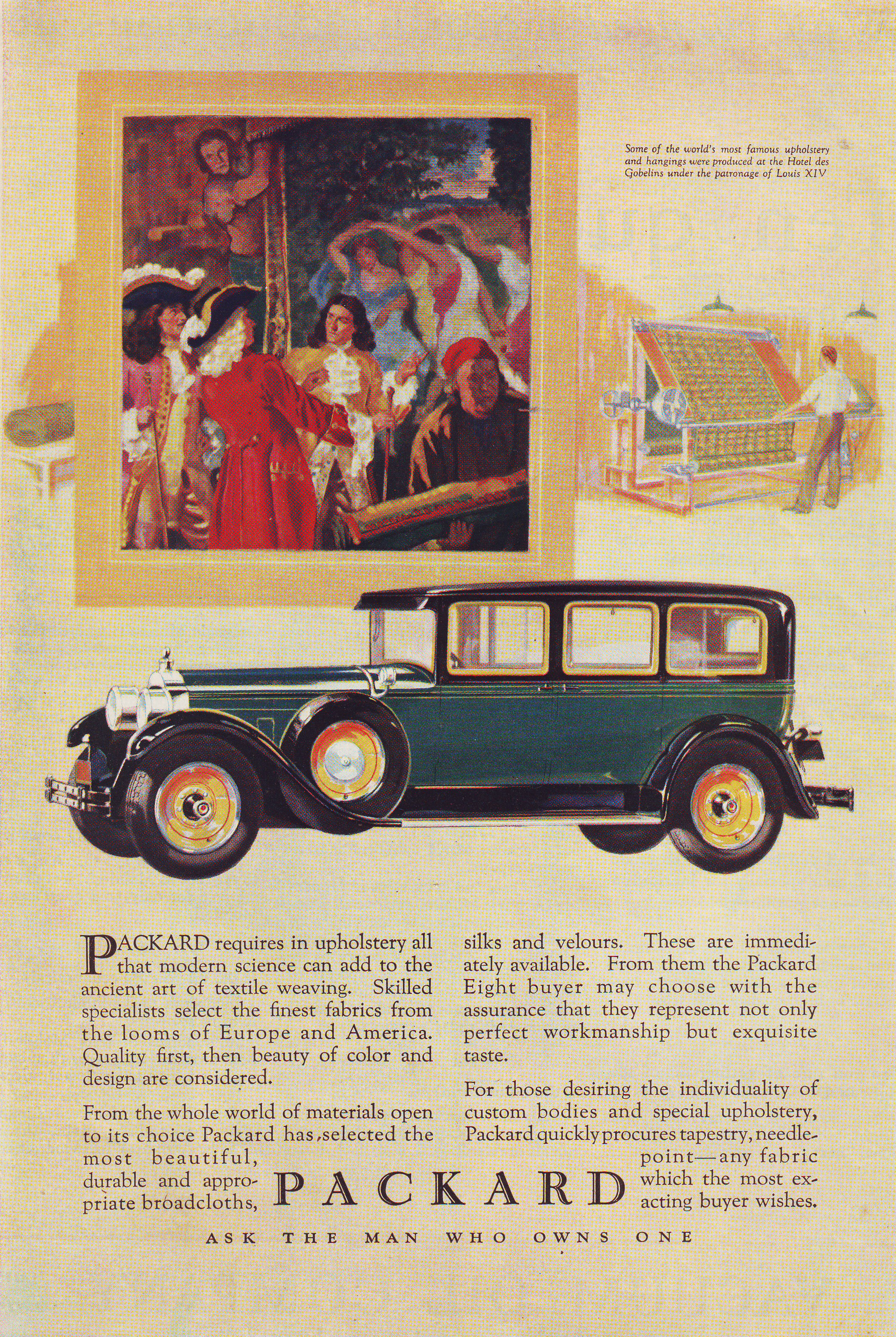
1927

The Packard advertising song on television had the words:

Ride ride ride ride ride along
in your Packard, in your Packard.
In a Packard you've got the world on a string.
In a Packard car you feel like a king.
Ride ride ride ride ride along
in your Packard, what fun!
And ask the man, just ask the man
the lucky man who owns one!

== Legacy ==
The electrical connectors developed by Packard were used extensively by General Motors in its automobiles. The first series of connectors was the Packard 56, followed by the Weather Pack, and finally, the Metri Pack, which are still in use. The former Packard Electric division of GM was later spun off as the Delphi Corporation, later renamed to Aptiv.

The National Packard Museum located in Warren, Ohio is the official museum of both the original Packard Motor Car Company and The Packard Electric Company. Its purpose is to preserve the Packard legacy and recognize Packard's influence in transportation and industrial history through interaction with the community and outreach programs.

America's Packard Museum holds a collection of Packard cars on display.

Packard Proving Grounds located in Shelby Township, MI are the remnants of the former proving Grounds owned by The Packard Motor Car Foundation. The mission of the Packard Proving Grounds Historic Site is to preserve the legacy of the Packard Motor Car Company through the restoration and preservation of the Packard Proving Grounds.

The Fort Lauderdale Antique Car Museum was closed after the COVID-19 pandemic and its entire collection of Packard cars and memorabilia was purchased by a local businessman. The collection was auctioned off in 2021.

Crushing around 50 vintage Packards occurred in 1977 in southern California and was dubbed by the Special-Interest auto magazine as "Crushathon". The cars were the property of a Packard collector and auctioned after his death. Due to different disagreements in the terms of the auction between SoCal Packard fan clubs, roughly half of the cars auctioned off did not meet the listed price leading to the cars being ultimately destroyed, despite their purportedly good mechanical and rust-free condition.

== See also ==
- Afton Station Packard Museum
- List of defunct automobile manufacturers of the United States
- List of Packard aero engines
- Packard 1A-1500
- Packard 1A-2500
- Toronto Transportation Commission
