= Packard XJ49 =

1940s American aircraft engine

XJ49
- Type: Turbofan
- National origin: United States
- Manufacturer: Packard
- First run: November 1948
- Number built: 1

The Packard XJ49 was the first U.S. designed turbofan aircraft engine, and was developed by the Packard Motor Co. in the 1940s.

== Design and development ==
In 1943, Packard leased a government-owned manufacturing plant located on the outskirts of Toledo, Ohio. The plant was previously operated by the defunct Aviation Corporation. Packard used the leased plant to manufacture parts for the Rolls-Royce Merlin engine, and referred to it as its Toledo Division. In the early-summer of 1944, the Army Air Force Materiel Command contracted with Packard to carry out "advanced aircraft engine development" on both the Merlin and gas-turbine engines. To oversee the new project, Packard hired Allison Engine Company's Robert M. Williams as their chief design engineer at the Toledo facility in July of that year. In October 1946 Williams and Dr. George F. Wislicenus, one of the engineers working under him, discussed ways of improving the efficiency of turbojet engines. They came up with an engine design which they called a "ducted fan". The resulting engine was Packard's model PT-205, with the military designation Packard XJ49-V-1 turbofan engine.

The XJ49 design was truly a break from conventional design practices of the time. Most turbojet engines then used one centrifugal compressor, one turbine wheel and multiple combustion chambers that resembled long cylinders arranged in a conical pattern. The XJ49 design had a two-stage compressor made up of an axial-flow supersonic compressor at the engine intake, driven by the second power turbine wheel, followed by a spirally-shaped mixed flow compressor, driven by the first turbine wheel, giving an overall compression ratio of 6:1.

Power from the annular combustion chamber exhaust drives the complex two-stage turbine. The discharge flow from the first turbine stage drives an independent second-stage turbine. The blades of the last stage of the second turbine are extended beyond the engine core to form a supersonic fan that provides air flow around the engine core for additional thrust and further combustion. Supplementary burning (reheat or afterburning) between the two turbines and in the tailpipe can also be used for additional thrust.

The period between drawing up the basic design theory and having a complete engine ready to make its first run on a test stand was unusually short, as Packard started testing the first (and only) XJ49 in November 1948. When the testing was complete, the XJ49 proved itself to be the most powerful jet engine in operation at the time.

== Survivors ==
On September 16, 1959, the United States Air Force released the XJ49 engine to the National Air Museum (now the National Air and Space Museum), and is now in storage at their Silver Hill, Maryland facility.

== Specifications (XJ49-V-1) ==
Data from Master Motor Builders

==== General characteristics ====
- Type: ducted fan (turbofan)
- Length:
- Diameter:
- Dry weight: 3,000 pounds (1,400 kg)

==== Components ====
- Compressor: compound: two-stage compressor (an axial-flow supersonic 1st stage followed by a mixed flow second stage)
- Combustors: annular
- Turbine: compound: the gas discharge from the first stage turbine drives the following two-stage turbine. The blades of the last stage of the second turbine section extend outside the engine core to form a supersonic bypass fan.

==== Performance ====
- Maximum thrust: take-off: 12,000 lbf (53 kN); military: 11,000 lbf (49 kN); normal: 10,000 lbf (44 kN); cruising: 2,560 lbf (11.4 kN) at 35,000 ft (11,000 m)
- Overall pressure ratio: 6:1
- Thrust-to-weight ratio: 4 (take-off); 3.67 (military); 3.33 (normal).

== See also ==
Related lists

- List of aircraft engines
