= Packard 300 =

Packard Model 2472 / 2572 / 2672 / 5472
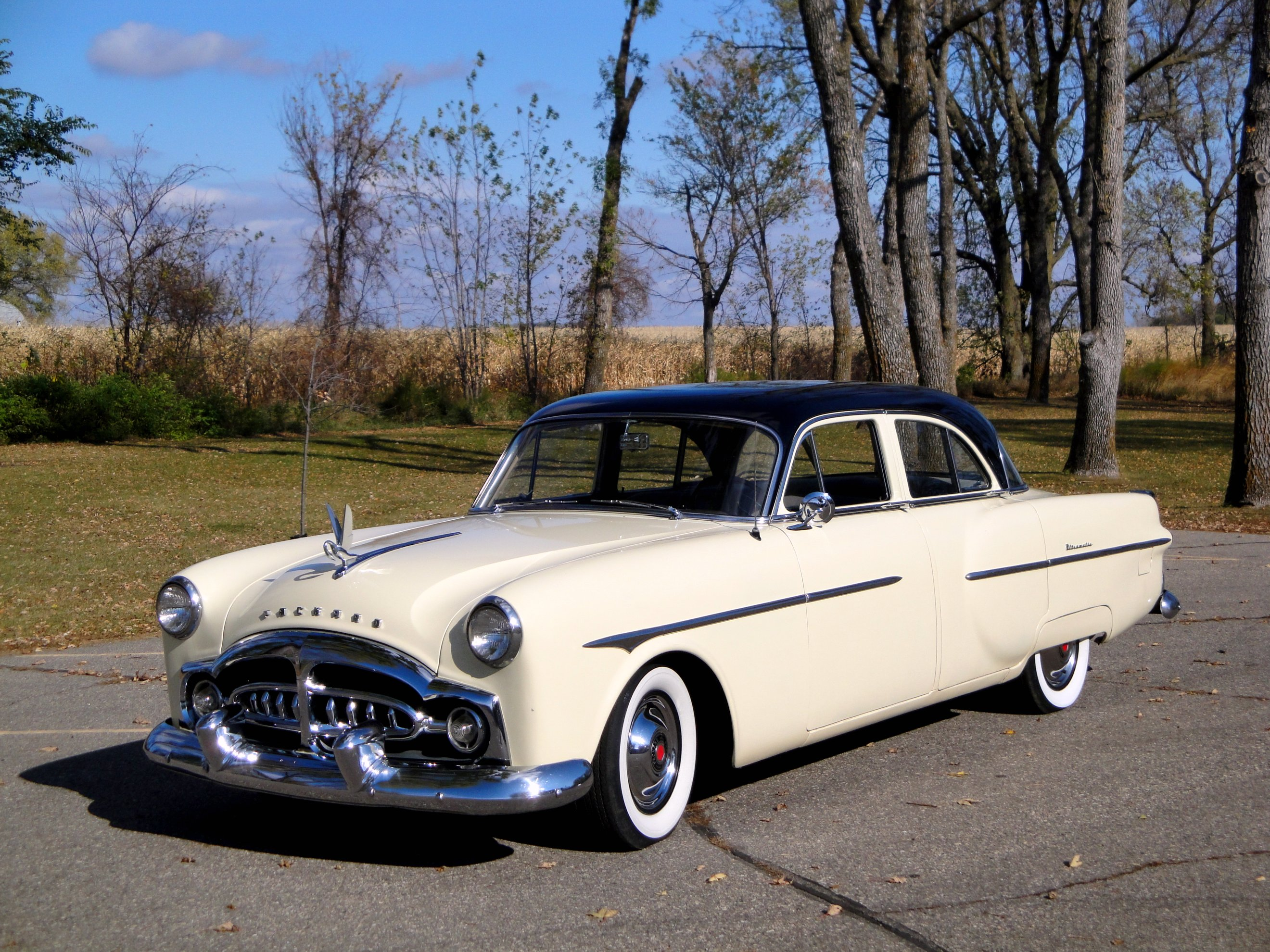
- 1951 Packard 300 4-door Touring Sedan

Overview
- Manufacturer: Packard
- Model years: 1951–1952 (300); 1953–1954 (Cavalier)
- Assembly: Packard Automotive Plant, Detroit, Michigan, U.S.
- Designer: John Reinhart

Body and chassis
- Class: Full-size luxury car
- Body style: 4-door sedan
- Layout: Front-engine, rear-wheel-drive
- Related: Packard 200; Packard 400; Packard Mayfair; Packard Pacific; Packard Caribbean

Powertrain
- Engine: 327 cu in (5.4 L) flat-head Straight-eight engine
- Transmission: 3-speed manual; 3-speed manual with overdrive; 2-speed Ultramatic automatic

Dimensions
- Wheelbase: 127 in (3,225.8 mm)
- Length: 217.8 in (5,532.1 mm)
- Width: 77.8 in (1,976.1 mm)
- Height: 62.9 in (1,597.7 mm)
- Curb weight: 3,925 lb (1,780 kg)

Chronology
- Predecessor: Packard Super Eight (1950)
- Successor: Packard Executive

The Packard 300 is an automobile built and sold by the Packard Motor Car Company of Detroit, Michigan for model years 1951 and 1952. The 300 represented the upper mid-range Packard model and provided better appointments than the Packard 200 or the Packard 250 models, and replaced the Packard Super Eight. The Packard Patrician 400 became the top level "senior" Packard replacing the Custom Super Eight. The 300 was positioned against the Buick Roadmaster, Cadillac Series 61, Chrysler Saratoga, Frazier Manhattan and Lincoln Cosmopolitan.

For both model years, the Packard 300 was built as a four-door sedan only and was mounted on Packard's 127-inch (3,200 mm) wheelbase. The car included the basic trim appointments found in the 200 and 200 Deluxe model lines and featured tinted windows, a robe rail for backseat passengers, and striped interior fabrics. Exterior trim included full wheel covers and Packard's "Winged Goddess" cormorant hood ornament. The 300 also had a wraparound rear window, which it shared with the Patrician models. All Packards beginning in 1951 offered exterior door handles installed in the stainless steel beltline that ran along the bottom of the windshield, side windows, and rear window.

Power for the car in both years came from Packard's venerable Super Eight engine, the 327-cubic-inch (5,360 cc) "Thunderbolt" inline eight, which was shared with the 250 line. A three-speed manual shift was standard, while Packard's Ultramatic automatic transmission was offered as optional equipment.

A total of 22,309 Packard 300s were built in the model's two years on the market with 1951's total of 15,309 representing the high sales mark for the 300 model. The 300 was $3,034 ($36,754 in 2024 dollars), with a heater and defroster, signal-seeking AM radio, windshield washers, rear wheel fender skirts, wheel trim rings, full wheel covers, and white sidewall tires available as optional equipment. In 1953, the 300 was renamed the Cavalier as Packard moved away from its strict numeric model naming structure. Neither 300 nor Cavalier is mentioned anywhere on the vehicle.

== Packard Cavalier ==
The Packard Cavalier is an automobile produced by the Packard Motor Car Company of Detroit, Michigan during 1953 and 1954. Produced only as a four-door sedan, the Cavalier took the place of the Packard 300 model that was fielded in 1951 and 1952 as Packard's mid-range priced vehicle, and was replaced by the Packard Executive.

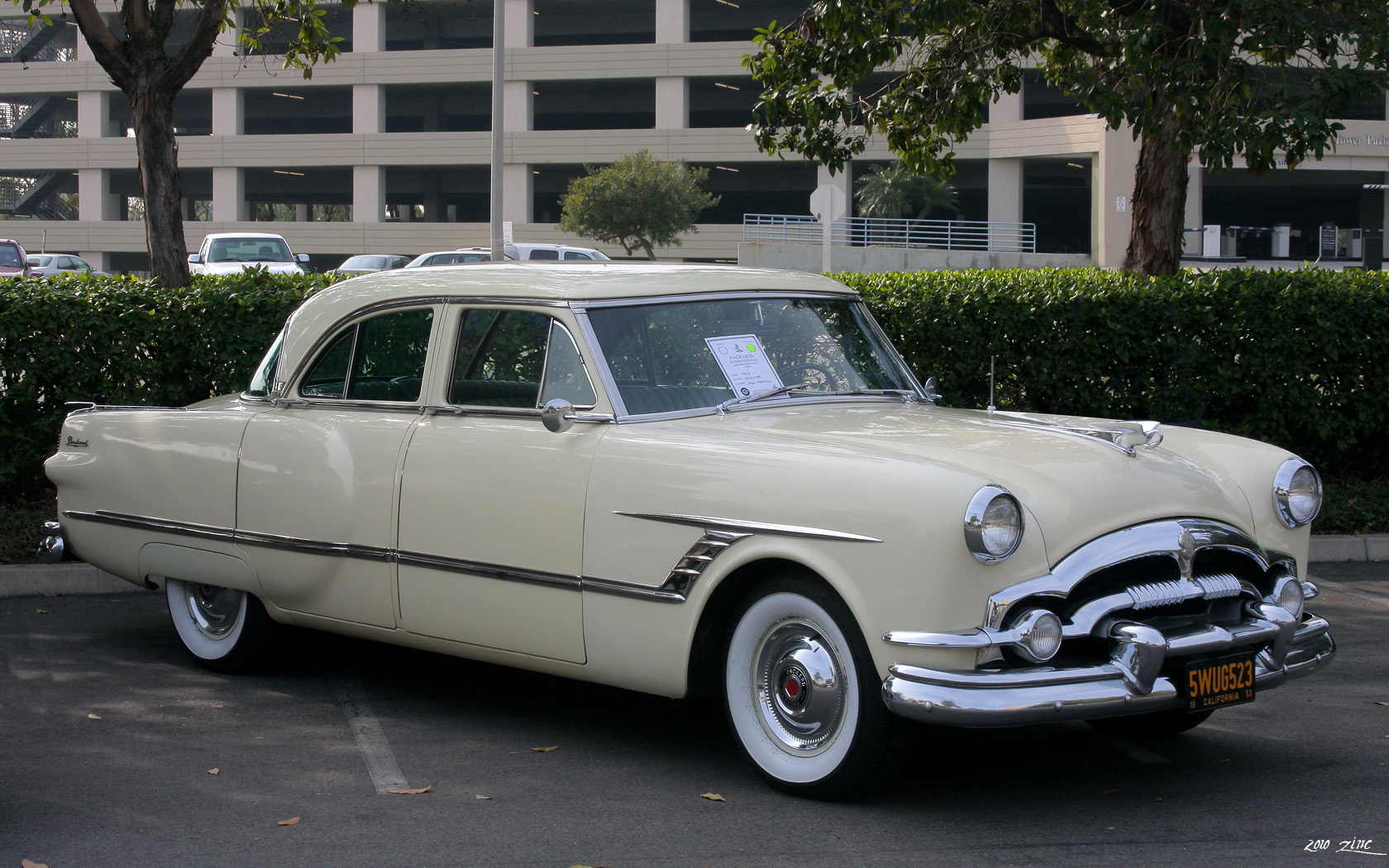
1953 Packard Cavalier

The 1953 Cavalier was easily identified from other Packards by its unique chrome side spear trim and a "fishtail" chrome fin added to the tail light, shared with all Packards for 1953.

Packard also created a Cavalier sub-series under which three other Packard models, marketed under various names were grouped:

- Packard Caribbean 2-door convertible based on the Packard Pan-American show car featuring coachwork by Mitchell-Bentley of Utica, Michigan
- Packard Mayfair which was based on the two-door Clipper Deluxe, but featuring higher interior luxury through fabrics and chrome trim.

A convertible model, using Cavalier trim, was offered during the 1953 model year and was priced lower than the Caribbean.

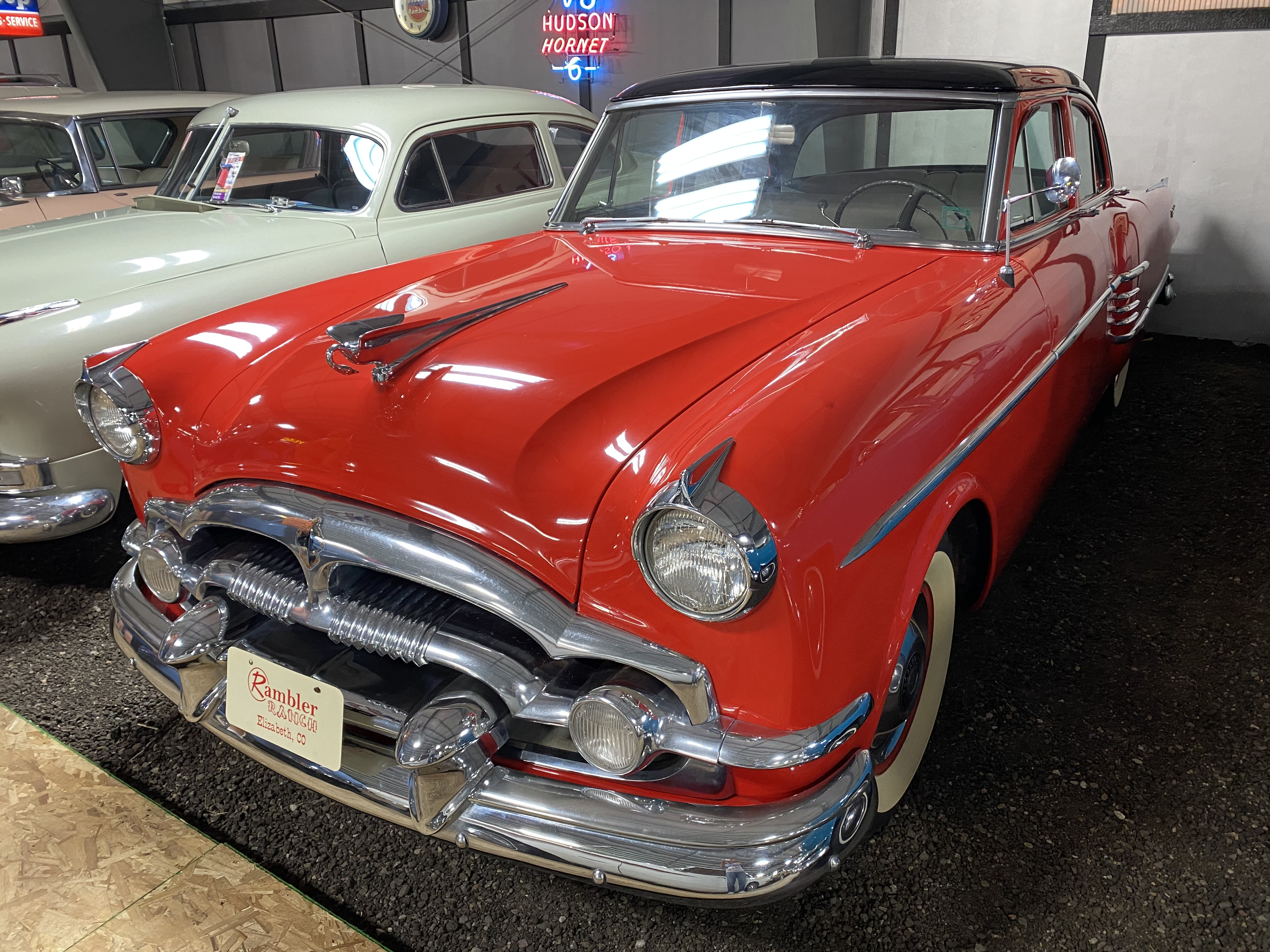
1954 Packard Cavalier

In 1954, the Cavalier was once again offered as a four-door sedan only, but the range also lost its subseries, and the Caribbean was moved into the senior Packard line, where it remained until Packard transferred manufacturing to South Bend in 1956. The 1954 Cavalier featured "slash" trim on the rear doors. It used the same 127 in (3,226 mm) wheelbase as the premium-level Patrician series but with the straight-eight engine as in the Clipper. This 327 cu in (5.4 L) I8 engine, equipped with a four-barrel Carter carburetor, was rated at 185 hp (138 kW; 188 PS).

For the 1955 model year, the Cavalier name was retired and the line was absorbed into the Packard Clipper Custom series.

== Sources ==
- Dawes, Nathaniel D. (1975). The Packard: 1942-1962. A.S. Barnes & Co. Inc., Cranbury NJ. ISBN 0-498-01353-7.
