= Packard Pan-American =

The Packard Pan-American is a concept car produced for the Packard Motor Car Company of Detroit, Michigan in 1952.

Conceived as a moderate-performance two-seater by Hugh Ferry, president of Packard, it was built by Henney, which was responsible for fitting custom hearse and ambulance bodies on Packard chassis. A status symbol for a carmaker at the time, this sort of car was a very unlikely project for Packard.

With styling by Henney, it was based on the 1951 Series 250 convertible, and ready in time for the 1952 New York International Motor Sports Show. Sectioned and channelled, in a fashion reminiscent of the 1953 Skylark, and wearing the trademark Packard grille, it "was elegantly trimmed throughout".

Packard spent US$10,000 ($118,409 in 2024 dollars) building the Pan-American, and management tried in vain to imagine, let alone develop, a market for a roadster projected to cost at least US$18,000 ($213,135 in 2024 dollars), at a time when the top-line Lincoln Capri six-passenger convertible went for US$3,665 ($43,397 in 2024 dollars), the premier eight-place Cadillac Series 75 Fleetwood US$5643 ($66,818 in 2024 dollars), and even Packard's Patrician 400, their most expensive production model, was only US$3,767 ($44,604 in 2024 dollars), and a six-seater.

As many as six examples were built. The Pan-American did inspire a successful six-place model, the Caribbean, which debuted in 1953.

== See also ==
- Panther concept car

== Sources ==
- Flory, J. "Kelly", Jr. "Packard Pan-American", in American Cars 1946-1959, p. 1022. Jefferson, NC: McFarland & Coy, 2008.
