= Packard Caribbean =

Full-size luxury coupe

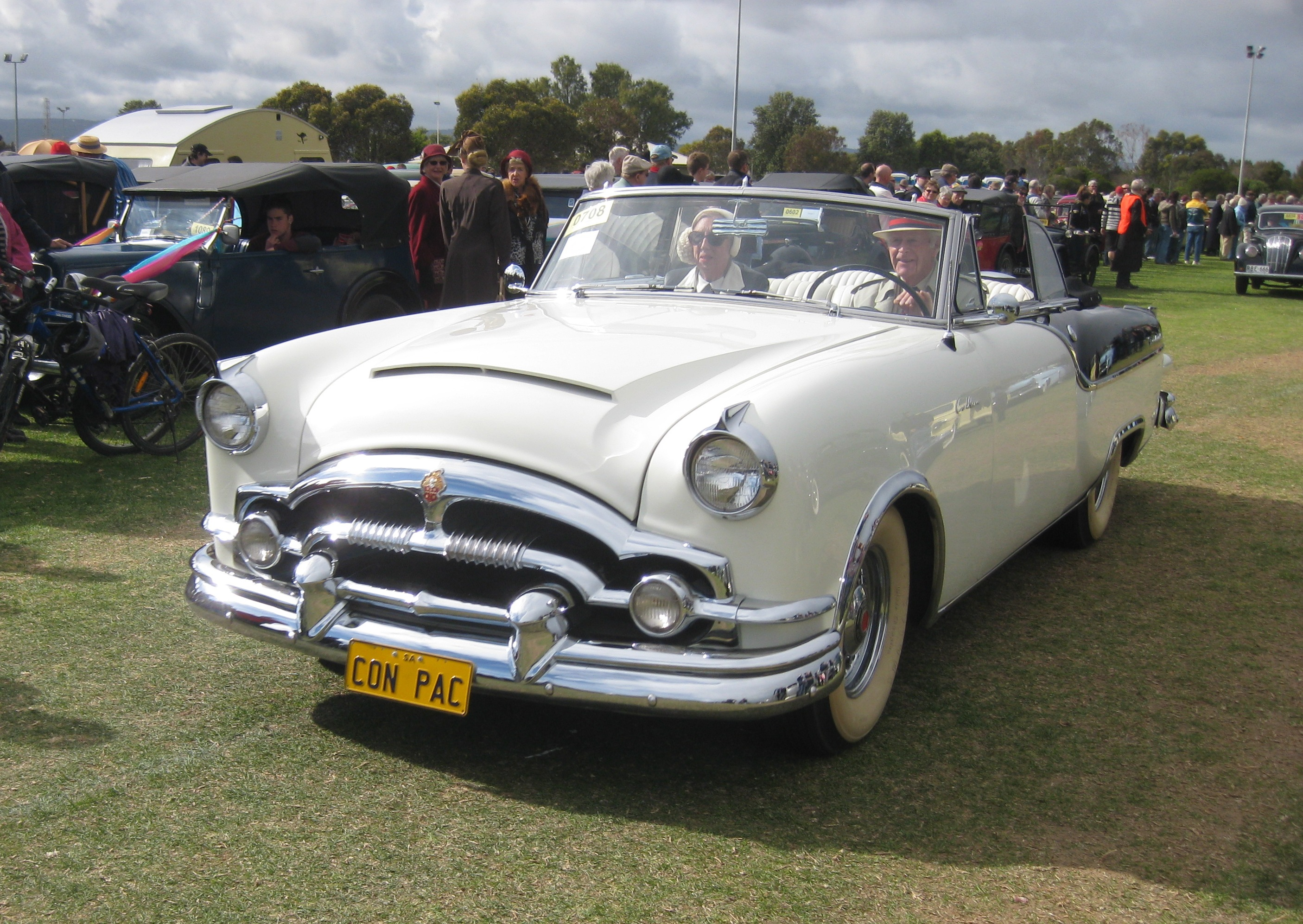
- 1954 Packard Caribbean

Overview
- Production: 1953–1956

Body and chassis
- Body style: 2-door convertible 2-door hardtop
- Related: Packard Mayfair (1953); Packard Pacific (1954); Packard Patrician; Packard Panther (1955)

Powertrain
- Engine: 327 cu in (5.4 L) 4-bbl. L-head I8 "Thunderbolt" (185 bhp) (1953); 359 cu in (5.9 L) 4-bbl. L-head I8 (212 bhp) (1954); 352 cu in (5.8 L) Dual 4-bbl. OHV 275 bhp V8 (1955); 374 cu in (6.1 L) Dual 4-bbl. OHV 310 bhp V8 (1956)
- Transmission: 2-speed Ultramatic automatic 3-speed manual w/overdrive

Dimensions
- Wheelbase: 122 in (3,099 mm) (1953-1954); 127 in (3,226 mm) (1955-1956)
- Length: 218.5 in (5,550 mm) (1953-1954); 216.5 in (5,499 mm) (1955-1956)
- Width: 77.8 in (1,976 mm) (1953-1956)
- Height: 62.3 in (1,582 mm) (1953-1954); 62.9 in (1,598 mm) (1955-1956)

Chronology
- Predecessor: Packard Super Eight Victoria Convertible

The Packard Caribbean is a full-sized luxury car that was made by the Packard Motor Car Company of Detroit, Michigan, during model years 1953 through 1956. Some of the Caribbean's styling was derived from the Pan American Packard show car of the previous year. Available only as a convertible from 1953 until 1955 with a hardtop model added in its final year of 1956.

== Development ==
The domestic "Big Three" automakers were developing "quasi-custom" models. Marketers at the time described them as a "sports car, which usually meant anything with a convertible top, lots of performance, a few unique styling touches, and top-of-the-line price tag.

The image of Packard automobiles during the early 1950s was "perceived as stodgy and old-fashioned." Packard needed a "halo car to cast a modern glow on the marque." The company prepared a concept car, the Packard Pan-American, earning positive reception at auto shows during 1952. The Caribbean was introduced for the 1953 model year as "Packard's sportiest car ... based on the standard Cavalier convertible, with custom touches transforming it into a line-topping stunner."

== 1953 ==
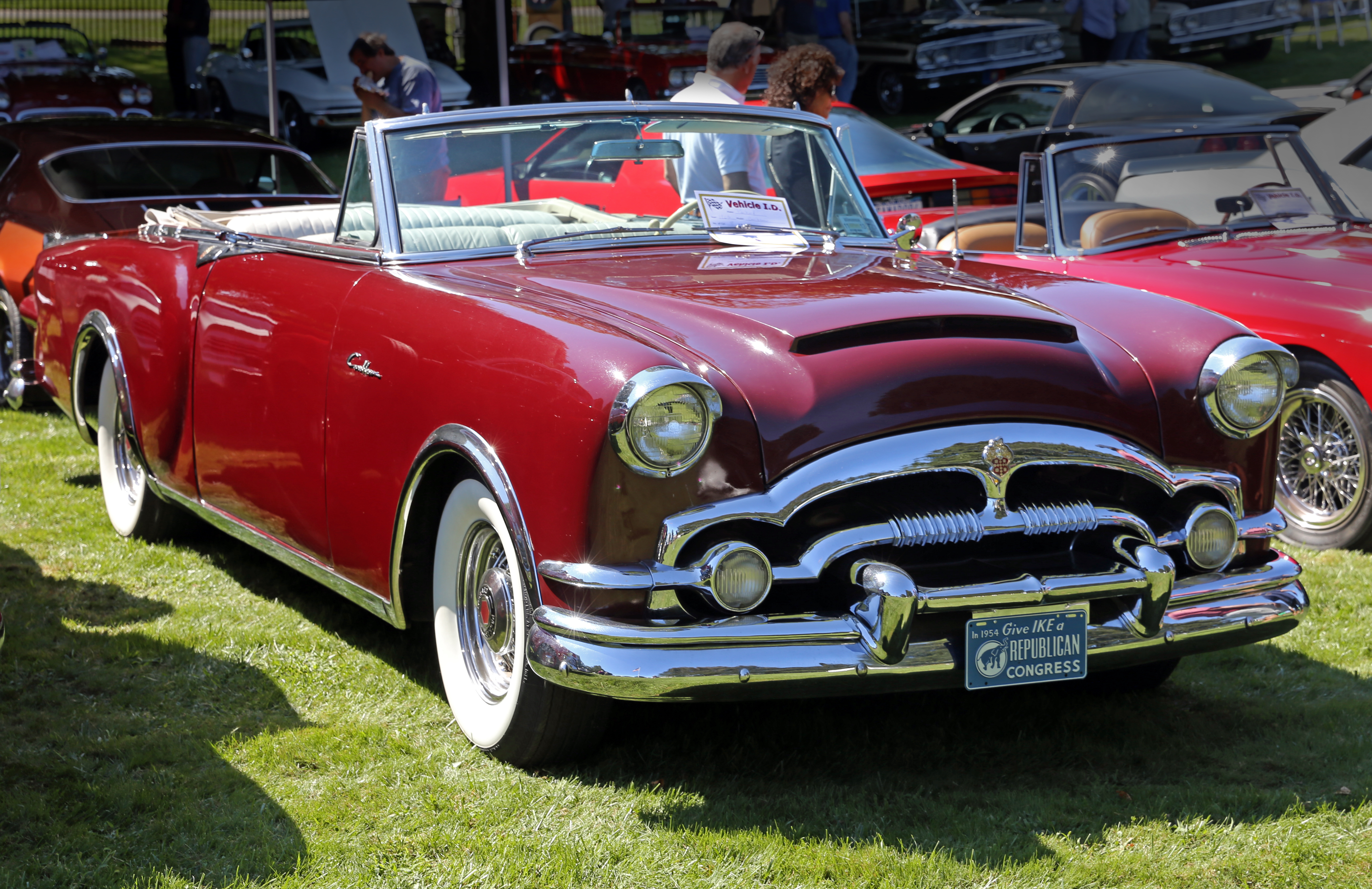
1953 Packard Caribbean Convertible

The 1953 Caribbean was perhaps Packard's most easily identified car because of its full cutout rear wheel housing and side trim, limited to a chrome band that outlined the bottom of the car's entire length. The band also helped further delineate the car's wheel openings, and the door handle was concealed and aligned with the chrome beltline surrounding the side windows, the bottom of the windshield, and the rear window. A steel continental spare tire was also standard.

The hood featured a broad, low leaded-in hood scoop. Bodies for the Caribbean were modified by Mitchell-Bentley Corporation of Ionia, Michigan instead of Briggs Manufacturing Company, who had supplied bodywork to Packard beginning in 1941. Available "advertised" colors for the car were limited to Polaris Blue, Gulf Green Metallic, Maroon Metallic, or Sahara Sand. However, a mere handful of special-ordered cars were built in Ivory or Black.

Interiors of the Caribbean were richly upholstered in leather. Most Caribbeans were also generously optioned, although the Ultramatic transmission was optional on the first year model at US$199 ($2,395 in 2025 dollars). A list of optional equipment on other Packard vehicles was standard on the Caribbean that included heater and windshield defroster, power windows, power-adjustable front seat, power steering, and "Easamatic" drum power brakes. Only the signal-seeking radio with antenna and "Solex" tinted glass were extra-cost items.

A total of 750 Caribbeans were built for the first model year. The listed retail price for the Caribbean Convertible was US$5,210 ($62,695 in 2025 dollars), placing as a competitor to the Cadillac Eldorado and Chrysler Imperial convertible. The convertible Caribbeans are sought after as collectible cars. Restored cars regularly sell in the six-figure ranges.

== 1954 ==
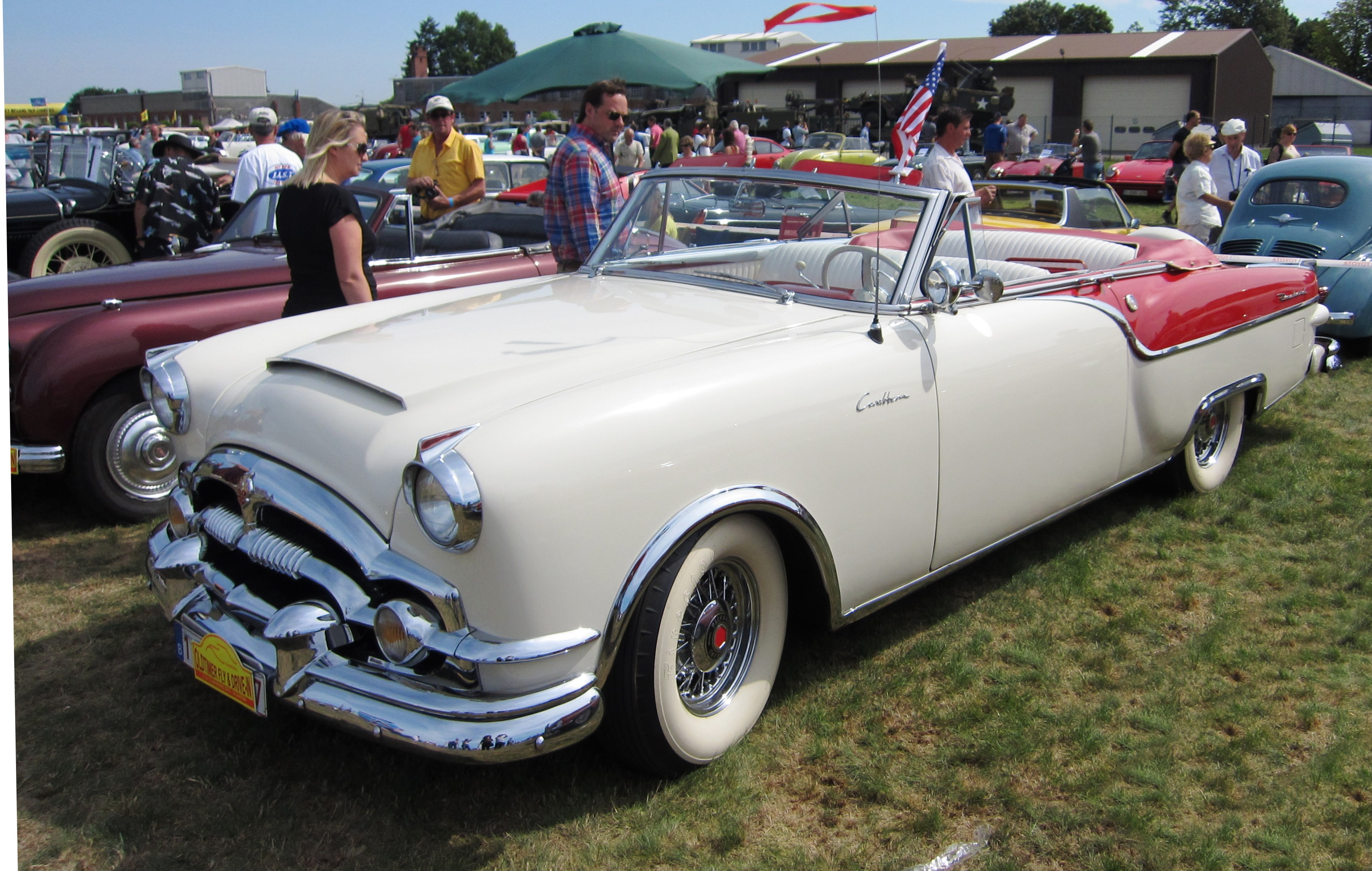
1954 Packard Caribbean Convertible

Beginning in 1954, the Caribbean was elevated to senior Packard status and was related to the Packard Pacific hardtop. The Caribbean continued to have its unique styling features. However, the full rear-wheel cut-outs were eliminated, and chrome/stainless trim became more liberal and allowed for two-tone paint combinations. A four-way power seat was available. along with standard equipped power steering, power assist "Easamatic" drum brakes, heater and windshield defroster, power-adjustable seats, and power windows.

Like the Patrician and the Pacific coupe, the Caribbean also gained heavier "finned" headlight housings, one of the visual cues applied to help differentiate the senior Packards from the lower-priced models. The 359-cubic-inch (5,880 cc) senior engine was used in this final incarnation of Packard's flat-head straight-eight, which had been introduced in 1924 in the Packard Eight. A total of 400 Caribbeans were produced for the model year, making 1954 the rarest year for the Caribbean. The listed retail price increased to US$6,100 ($73,132 in 2025 dollars)

== 1955 ==
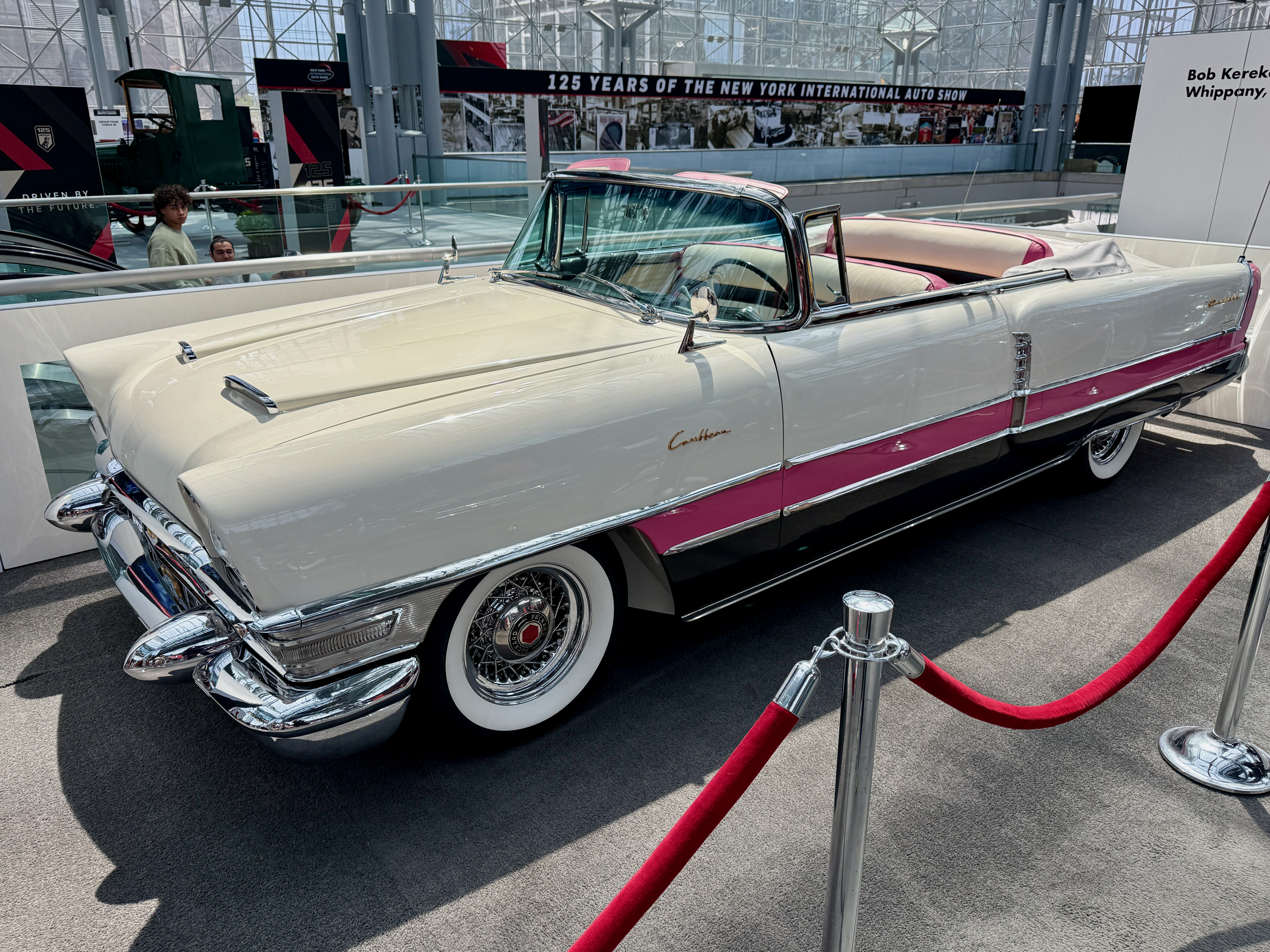
1955 Packard Caribbean Convertible

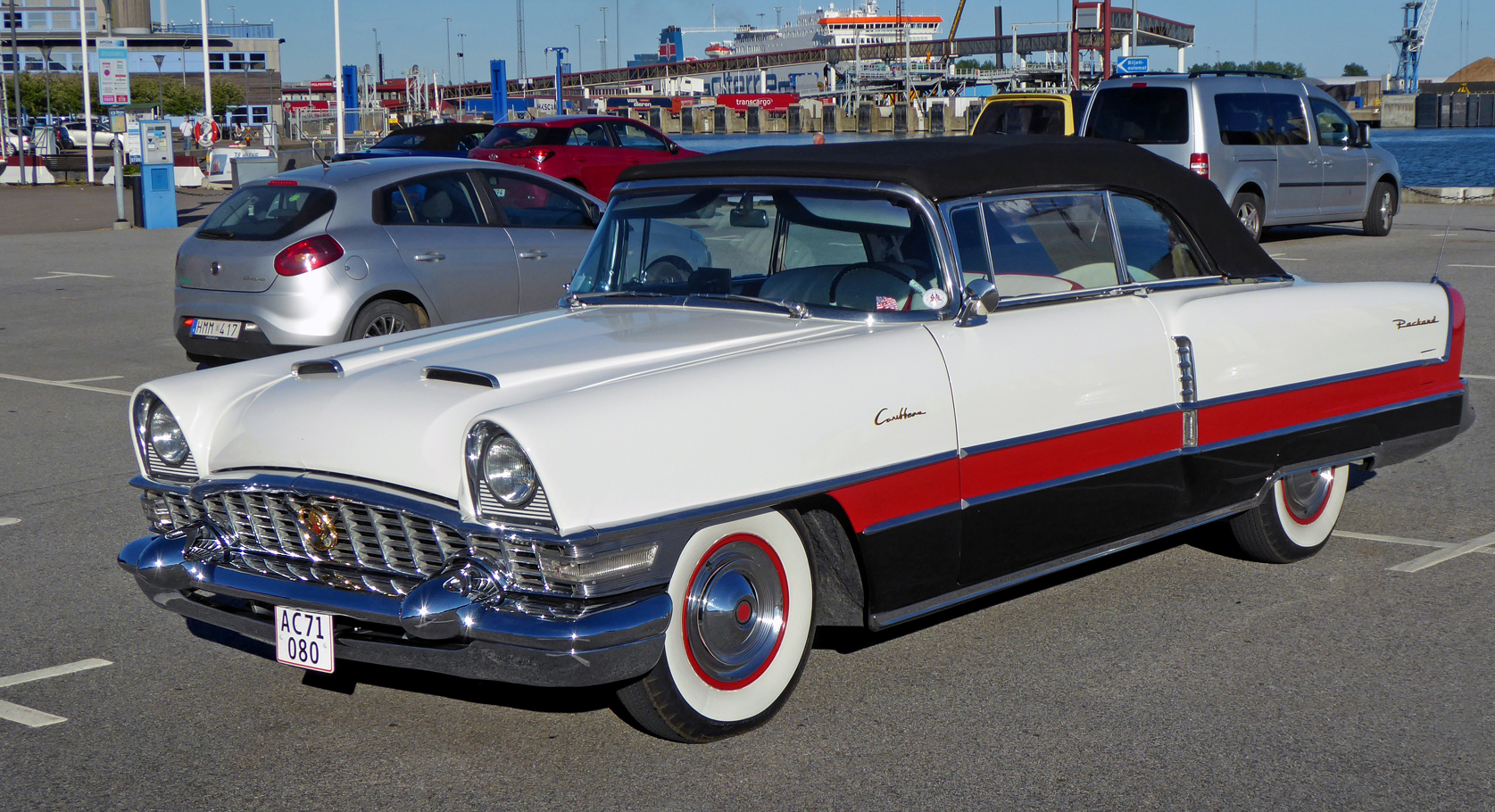
1955 Packard Caribbean Convertible

The model year 1955 saw the Caribbean line, now with an all-new Packard developed Over-Head Valve V8 engine, fully adopt the Senior Packard line styling. The car was available in two or three-tone paint patterns. Designer Dick Teague succeeded in restyling the old Packard Senior body into a modern-looking design. The single hood scoop was split into two units, and the car also received Packard's Torsion-Level Torsion bar suspension at all four wheels. The listed retail price was $US5,932 ($71,295 in 2025 dollars). Production for 1955 Caribbean increased to 500 units.

== 1956 ==
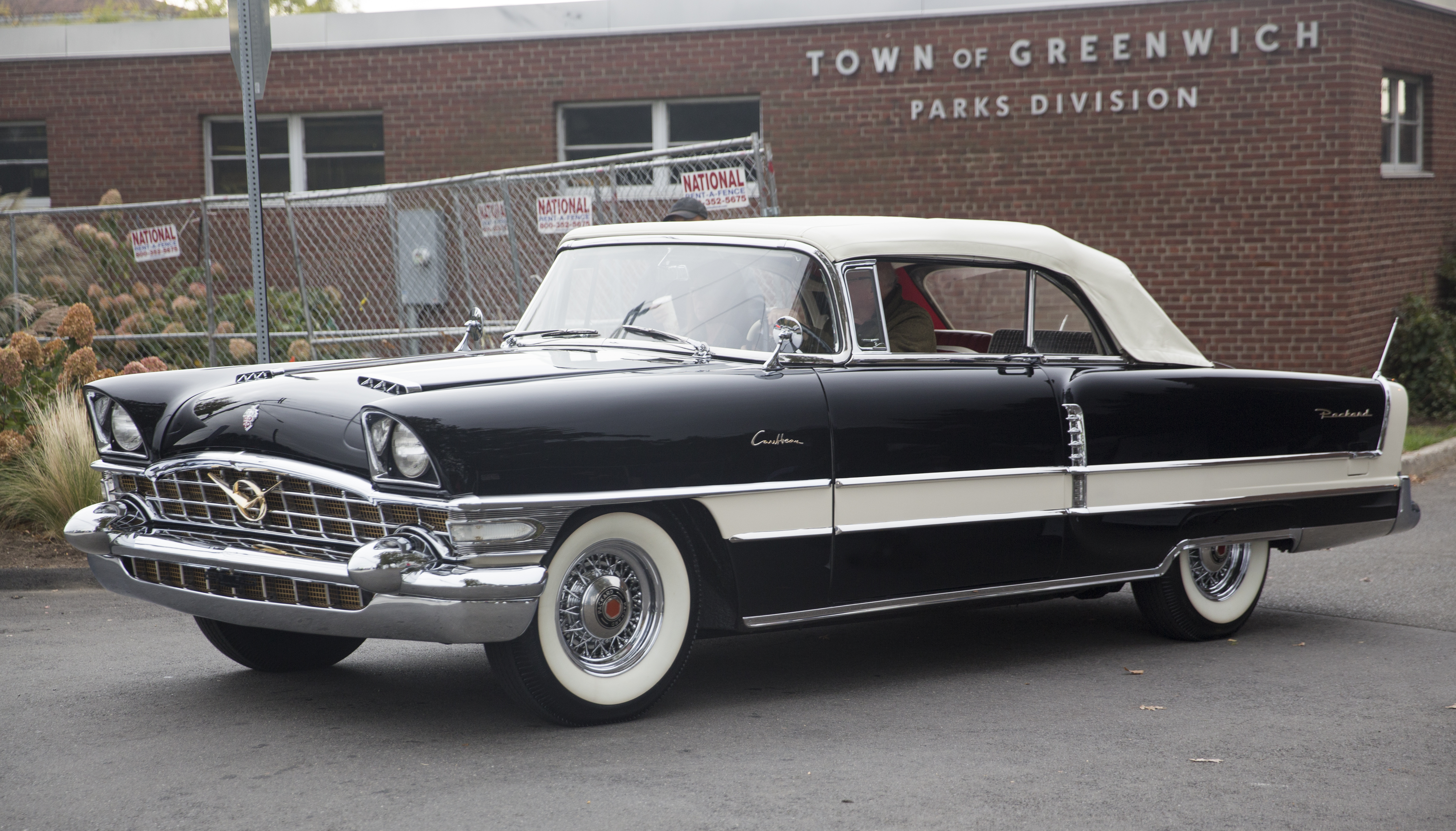
1956 Packard Caribbean Convertible

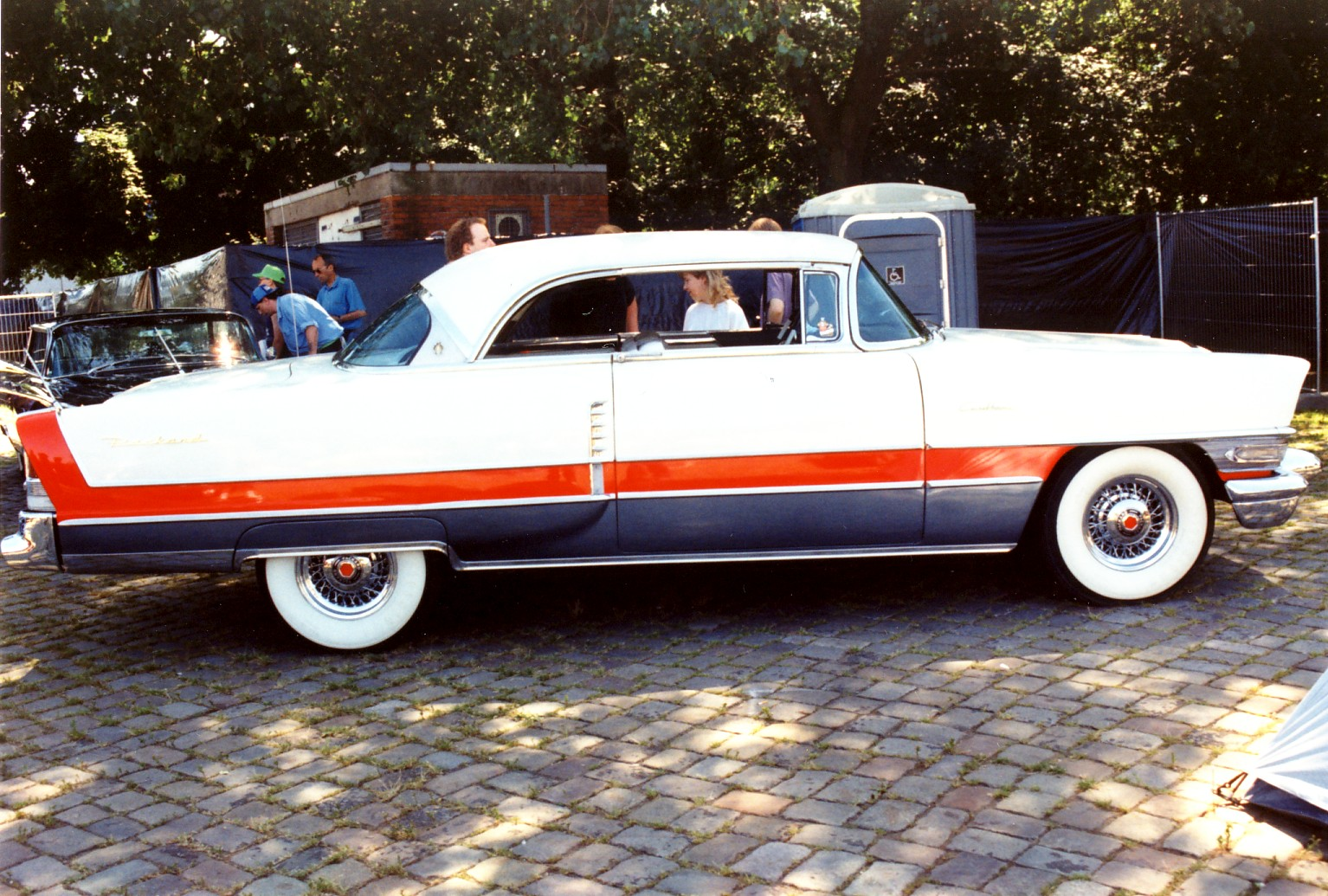
1956 Packard Caribbean Hardtop

For the 1956 model year, the Caribbean was designated as a separate luxury series, and a hardtop model was added. Trim styling differences between the 1955 and 1956 cars were minimal, with new tri-tone exterior color combinations the most visible differentiation. The Grille textures changed to match those used on concurrent Patricians. The rear treatment, featuring Packard's cathedral-style taillights was continued. The headlights also received slightly more exaggerated brows. Unique new interiors featured reversible seat cushions with cloth on one side and leather on the other. The thick foam rubber cushions eliminated coil springs in the seats, preventing sagging, while the covers could be removed for cleaning

The 374 cu in (6.1 L) V8 engine included Packard's "Ultramatic" push-button automatic transmission. The engine features dual four-barrel carburetors and a 10:1 compression ratio to develop 310 hp (231 kW; 314 PS) and with 405 pound force-feet (549 N⋅m) of torque, the highest-rated power among U.S. automobiles. A 12-volt system was introduced, and electrically operated door locks were new. All Packards offered a new limited-slip rear differential.

Total model year production equaled 263 hardtops and 276 convertibles, with the convertible being the most expensive Packard model listing at US$5,995 ($70,993 in 2025 dollars).

The model was discontinued when the original Packard model production ended with the automaker's Detroit engineering and assembly shutdown.

== See also ==
- GAZ-13, Soviet Chaika

== Sources ==
- Auto Editors of Consumer Guide (October 16, 2007). "1953-1956 Packard Caribbean". auto.howstuffworks.com.
- George, Vance- The Packard Club 53-54 Caribbean Roster Keeper
