= Packard 200 =

Packard 200/250
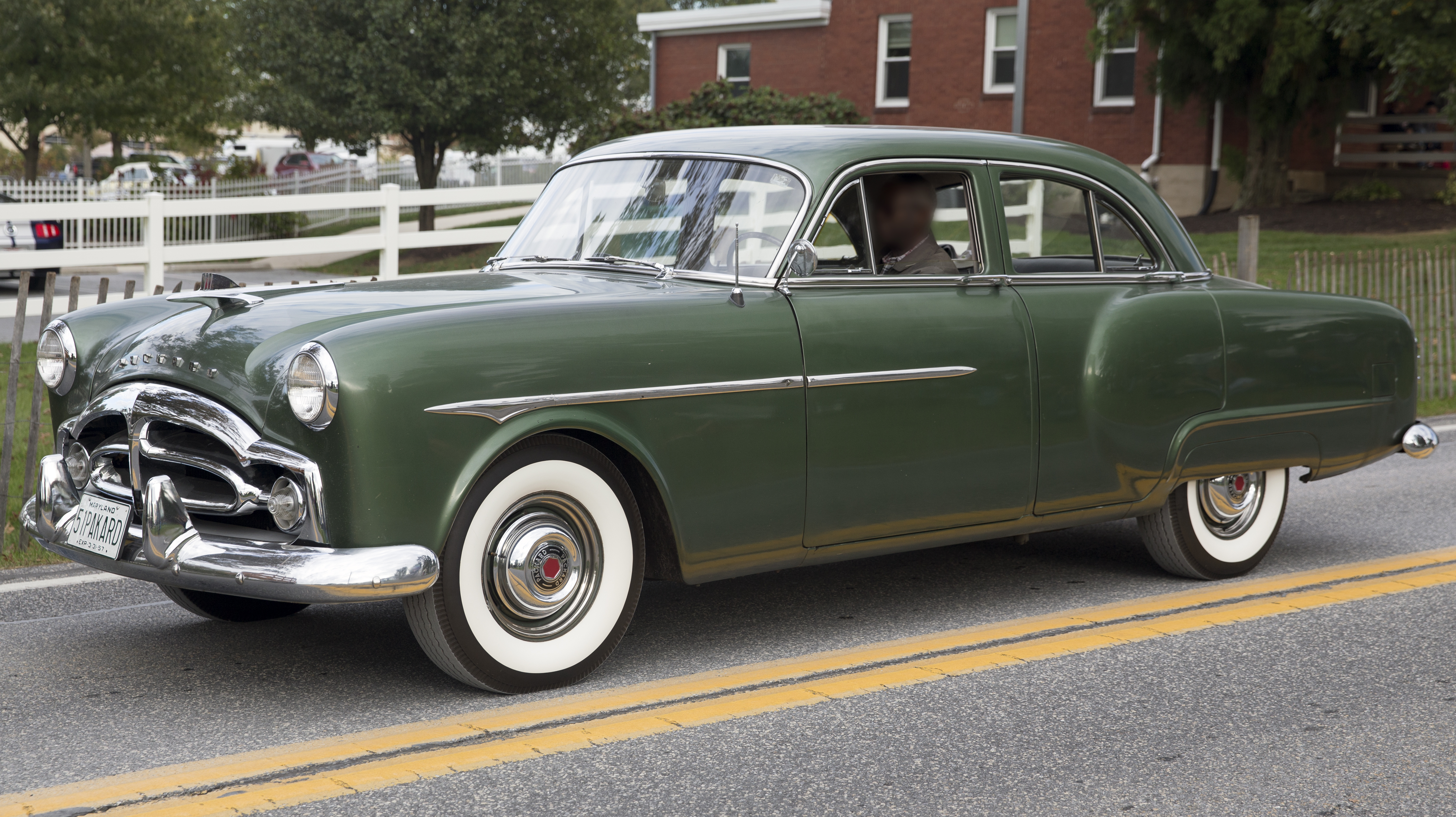
- 1951 Packard 200 Deluxe 4-door Sedan

Overview
- Manufacturer: Packard
- Model years: 1951–1952
- Assembly: Packard Automotive Plant, Detroit, Michigan, U.S.
- Designer: John Reinhart

Body and chassis
- Class: Full-size luxury car
- Body style: 200: 2-door coupé; 4-door sedan; 250: 2-door hardtop ("Mayfair"); 2-door convertible
- Layout: Front-engine, rear-wheel-drive
- Related: Packard 300; Packard Patrician 400

Powertrain
- Engine: 288 cu in (4.7 L) I8 (200 series); 327 cu in (5.4 L) I8 (250 series)
- Transmission: 3-speed manual; 3-speed manual with overdrive; 2-speed Ultramatic automatic

Dimensions
- Wheelbase: 122 in (3,098.8 mm)
- Length: 209.4 in (5,318.8 mm) (200 series); 217.8 in (5,532.1 mm) (250 series)
- Width: 77.9 in (1,978.7 mm)
- Height: 62.7 in (1,592.6 mm) (200 series); 62 in (1,574.8 mm) (250 series)
- Curb weight: 3,550–4,040 lb (1,610–1,830 kg)

Chronology
- Predecessor: Packard Eight (1950)
- Successor: Packard Clipper (coupé/sedan); Packard Mayfair (1952 hardtop); Packard Pacific (1953 hardtop)

The Packard 200 is an automobile model produced by the Packard Motor Car Company of Detroit, Michigan during model years 1951 and 1952. Models in the 200 designation represented the least expensive Packard model range, on the firm's shortest wheelbase, and least powerful 288 cu in (4.7 L) 8-cylinder in-line engine. It replaced the Packard One-Twenty and the Packard One-Ten, and was renamed the Packard Clipper for the 1953 model year.

Concurrently, the company also produced the Packard 250, which shared the same basic body and wheelbase as the 200, but was equipped with Packard's larger 327 cu in (5.4 L) 8-cylinder in-line engine and stylized with more upscale exterior detailing. The 250 model line consisted of the convertible and the Mayfair hardtop.

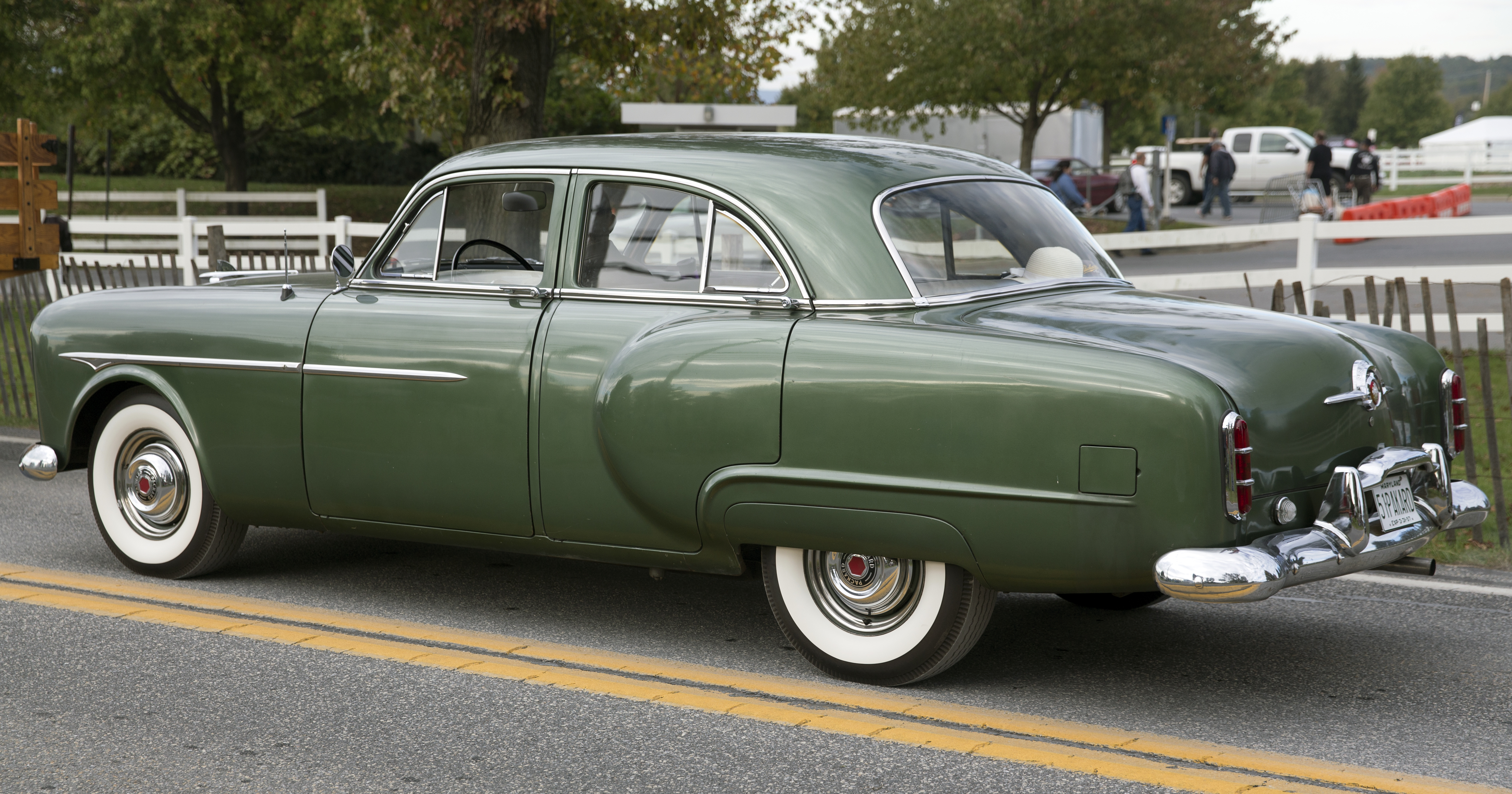
Rear view

== Overview ==
The 1951 Packard 200 and 250 were introduced as Packard's least expensive model range on August 24, 1950, taking the place of the low-line Packard Standard models which were eliminated for the 1951 model year. The 200 debuted as part of the fully redesigned Packard line, attributed to John Reinhart. Replacing the bulbous, ponton appearance, 1948-1950 Packards in the 22nd and 23rd Packard Series, Reinhart's "High Pockets" design was more formal than its predecessor, and would serve Packard until the end of the 1956 model year when true Packard production ceased.

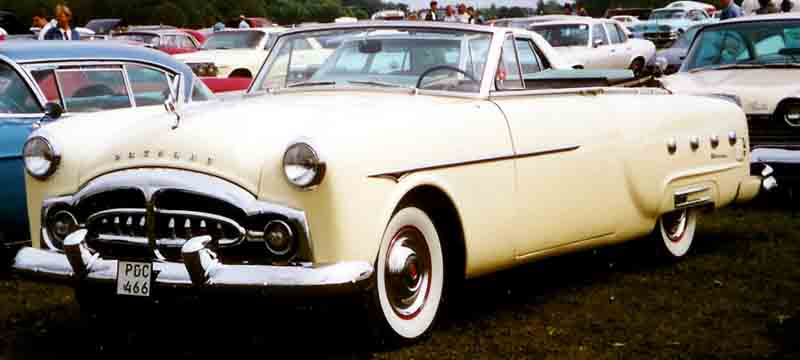
1951 Packard 250 convertible

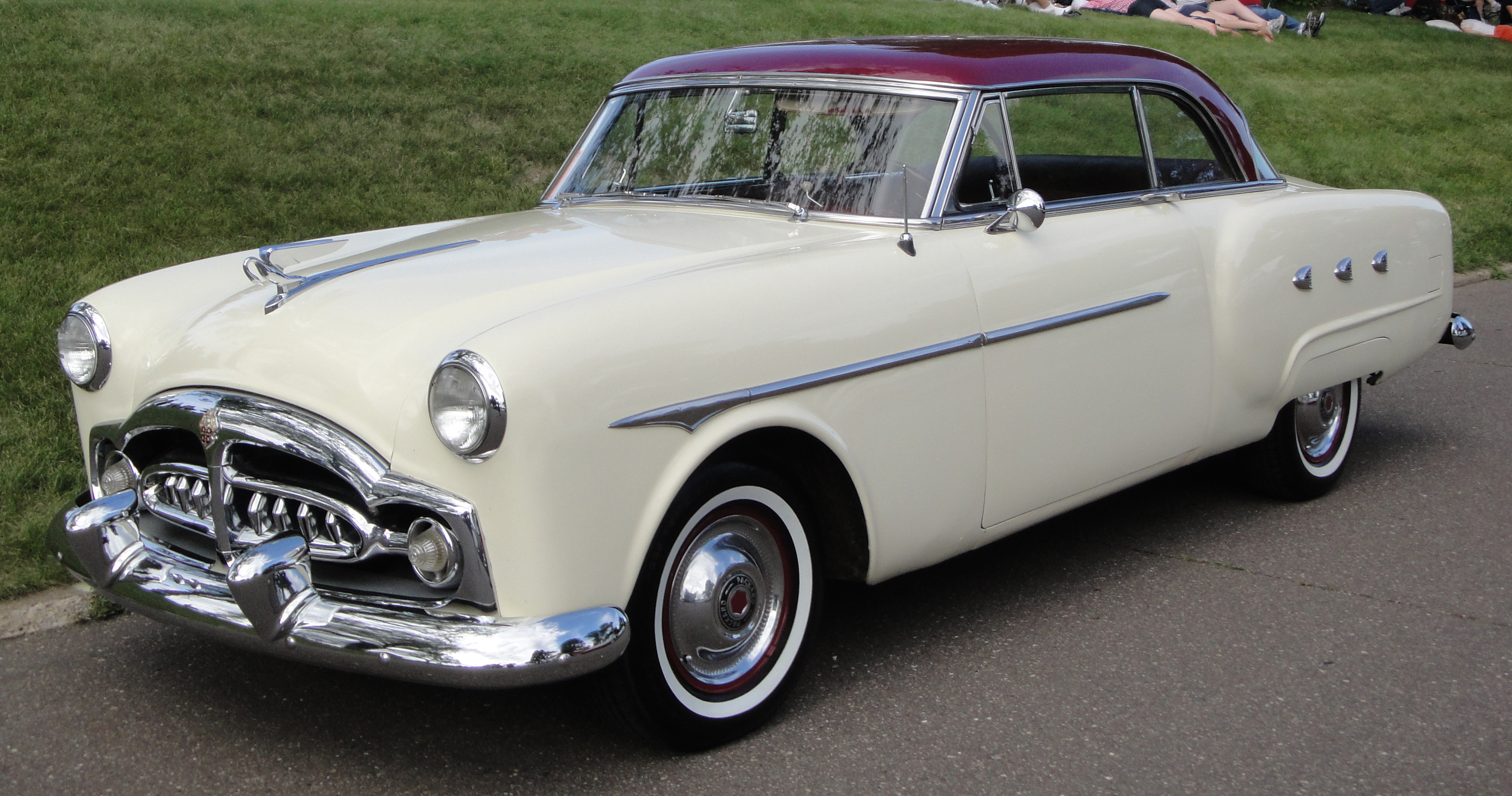
1952 Packard 250 Mayfair hardtop

Both the 200 and the 250 were considered "junior" series cars, and were separated from the Packard 300 and Packard Patrician 400 models by their shorter wheelbases (122 in or 3,100 mm versus 127 in or 3,230 mm) and lesser trim appointments. Packard 200 standard models were available as a four-door sedan, two-door coupé, and a three-passenger business coupé (lacking a rear seat). While similar in appearance to the senior cars, the junior Packard lacked the noted Packard cormorant hood ornament and had vertical tail lights instead of the horizontal units on the senior models. The junior models also lacked the wrap-around rear window feature found on senior Packard sedan models.

The 250 model range was introduced in March 1951, and was specially designed to fill the vacuum of Packard having neither a hardtop or convertible in its 1951 model range when the Victoria Convertible was discontinued. Besides their unique body styles, 250's received three jet-louvers on each rear-quarter panel. Better grade trim and fabric were used within.

All Packard 200 models came with twin horns, two sun visors, front and rear bumper guards, spare tire and jack set. Deluxe trim level included the spartan appointments found on the standard models, and added chrome wheel rings, and turn indications as standard. White-wall tires and full-wheel covers were also extra. The 288 cu in (4.7 L) straight-eight produces 135 hp (101 kW) at 3600 rpm with a 7.0:1 compression ratio - Ultramatic-equipped cars received a slightly higher compression ratio of 7.5:1 thanks to which it offered 138 hp (103 kW). The 327 V8 was also available as an option on the 200 for $45, considerably less than the cost of a heater/defroster. The 1951 4-door Touring Sedan was listed at $2,616 ($31,690 in 2024 dollars).

Items which have since become standard to the auto industry since the late 1960s such as heater, radio, tinted glass, carpeting, etc., were all optional on the Packard, as well as other premium cars during that era. Packard also became the first car-maker to offer power-brakes in 1951. “Easamatic” as they were trademarked, were a product of Bendix and an exclusive to Packard.

Changes for 1952 were minimal, and centered on the requisite annual trim updates. Packard did drop the Business Coupé, a move that other U.S. automakers were also making at the same time.

== Marketing legacy ==
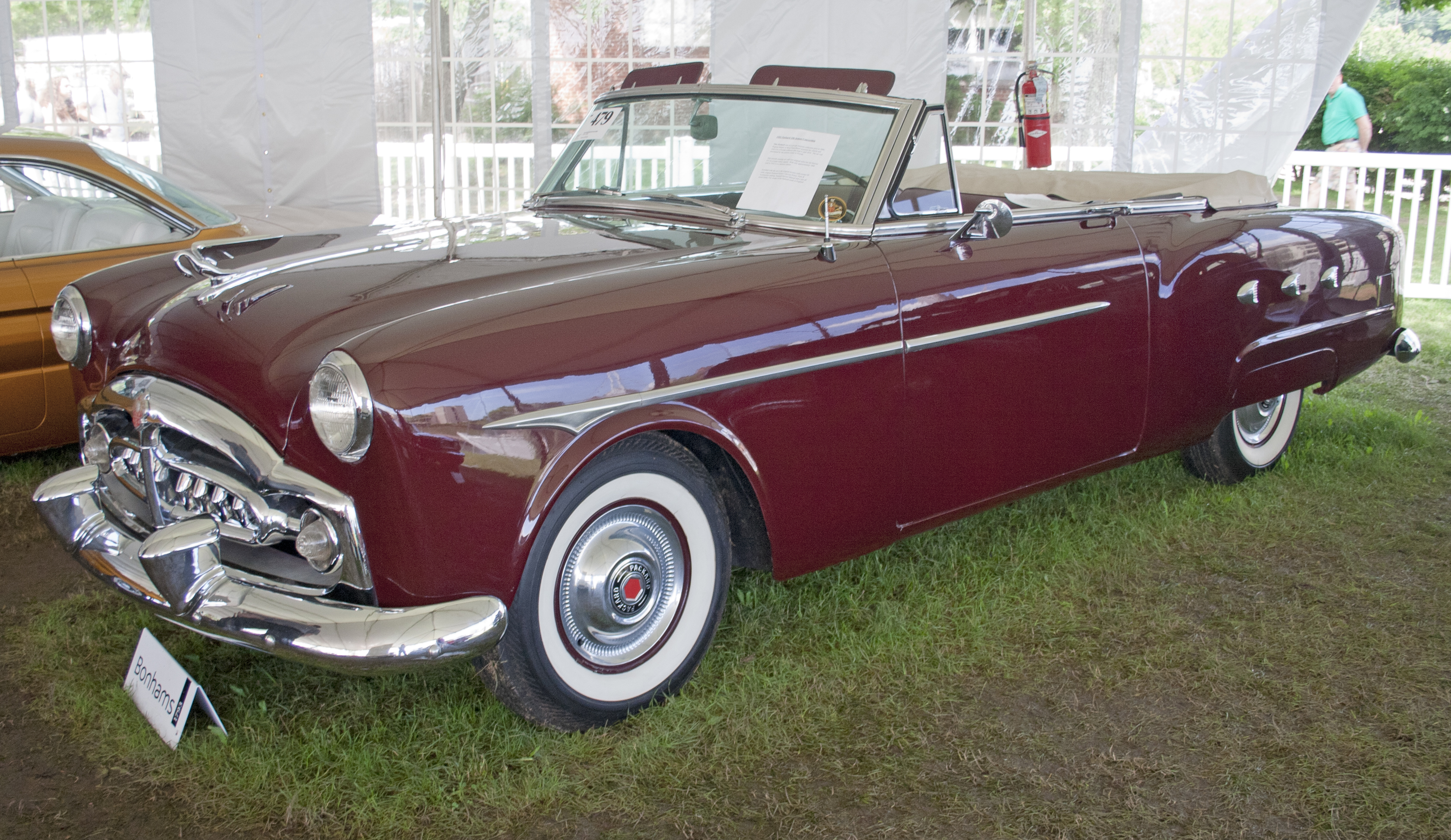
1952 Packard 250 convertible

While Packard's overall sales for 1951 were over 100,000 units, too many of the units sold were low-line models in the 200 and 250 series. Senior Packards – the traditional prewar niche that Packard ruled in the 1920s and 1930s – offered during 1951 and 1952 were only available as two models, the 300 and the Patrician 400, both of which were only available in a single body type, the four-door sedan. Dealers, who were quick to appease their customers, sold Packard 300 and Patrician 400 model trim and applied it to the lesser Packard 200 and 250 models, diluting the Senior Packards of the visual uniqueness that separated them from lesser priced cars.

To remedy this, Packard hired James J. Nance, the CEO of Hotpoint to reestablish Packard as an automotive leader. Among Nance's first moves was to begin building model identity by dropping the numeric model designations and renaming the entire range of models. Nance also saw to it that Senior Packards received broader visual cues and trim to separate themselves from lesser models. Nance also began creating different specialty and show cars in an attempt to create "buzz" in the automotive press and make Packard look less moribund, like the Packard Pan-American and the Packard Panther.

The 200 and 250 models were renamed the Packard Clipper Special and Clipper Deluxe, part of Nance's plan to ultimately spin the cars off into their own make in 1956 as the standalone Clipper and return the Packard name to a maker of strictly luxury automobiles.

== Production statistics ==
Total Packard production numbers for both years on both models:

- 1951, 200 (Standard - all body styles), 24,310 units
- 1951, 200 (Deluxe - all body styles), 47,052 units
- 1951, 250 (all body styles) 4,640 units (Introduced in March 1951, partial model year tally)
- 1952, 200 (Standard - Touring sedan, 13'934 units
- 1952, 200 (Deluxe - Touring sedan, 25,880 units
- 1952, 200 (club sedan), 3,456 units
- 1952, 200 (deluxe club sedan) 3450 units
- 1952, 250 (all body models), 5,201 units
