= Packard Mayfair =

Model 2467-2469 (1951)/2577-2579 (1952)/2677-2679 (1953)
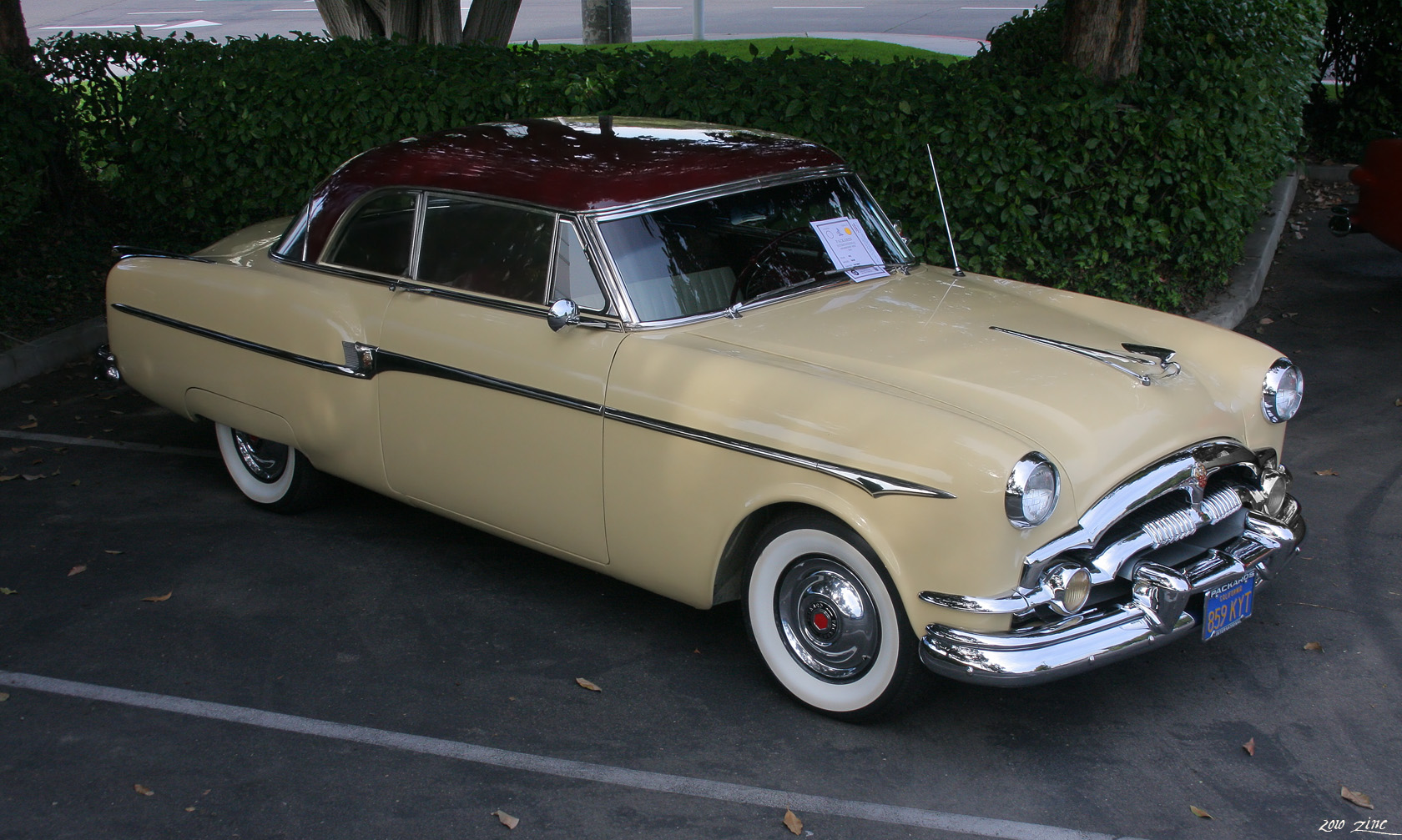
- 1953 Packard Mayfair

Overview
- Manufacturer: Packard
- Model years: 1951–1953
- Assembly: Packard Automotive Plant, Detroit, Michigan, United States

Body and chassis
- Class: Full-size luxury car
- Body style: 2-door hardtop 2-door convertible
- Layout: Front-engine, rear-wheel-drive
- Related: Packard 200; Packard 300; Packard Caribbean (1953); Packard Patrician

Powertrain
- Engine: 327 cu in (5.4 L) 4-bbl. L-head I8 (212 hp)
- Transmission: 2-speed Ultramatic automatic 3-speed manual w/overdrive

Dimensions
- Wheelbase: 122 in (3,099 mm)
- Length: 209.4 in (5,319 mm)
- Width: 77.8 in (1,976 mm)
- Height: 62.3 in (1,582 mm)
- Curb weight: 3,820 lb (1,733 kg)

Chronology
- Successor: Packard Pacific

The name Mayfair was applied to the 1951–1953 Packard 250 as a hardtop coupe nameplate built by the Packard Motor Corporation in an attempt to compete in this body style with the Oldsmobile 98 Holiday, Buick Roadmaster Riviera, Lincoln Capri and Chrysler New Yorker Newport hardtop coupes. It was named for the City of Westminster's luxurious district Mayfair in London, England. The coupe body style was also used for a convertible, while the Mayfair model name was exclusive to the hardtop.

When the Packard body style was updated for 1951, the door handle was concealed and aligned with the chrome beltline that surrounded the side windows, bottom of the windshield and rear window.

The Mayfair came standard-equipped with a three speed manual transmission, while Packard's Ultramatic automatic transmission, four-way power seat, leather upholstery, power steering, power assist "Easamatic" drum brakes, heater and windshield defroster, chrome cormorant hood ornament, and power windows were available as extra cost options. The Convertible came standard with leather upholstery and a power operated top, and had a retail price of $3,939 ($47,621 in 2024 dollars) while the hardtop was offered at $3,234 ($39,177 in 2024 dollars)

The Mayfair was succeeded in 1954 by the Pacific, which achieved Senior status with the inclusion of the larger 359 cu in (5.9 L) 4-bbl. L-head Straight-eight engine and full "senior trim" of the Packard Patrician, while the Convertible continued as the Model 5479 Convertible and the all-new Packard Caribbean.

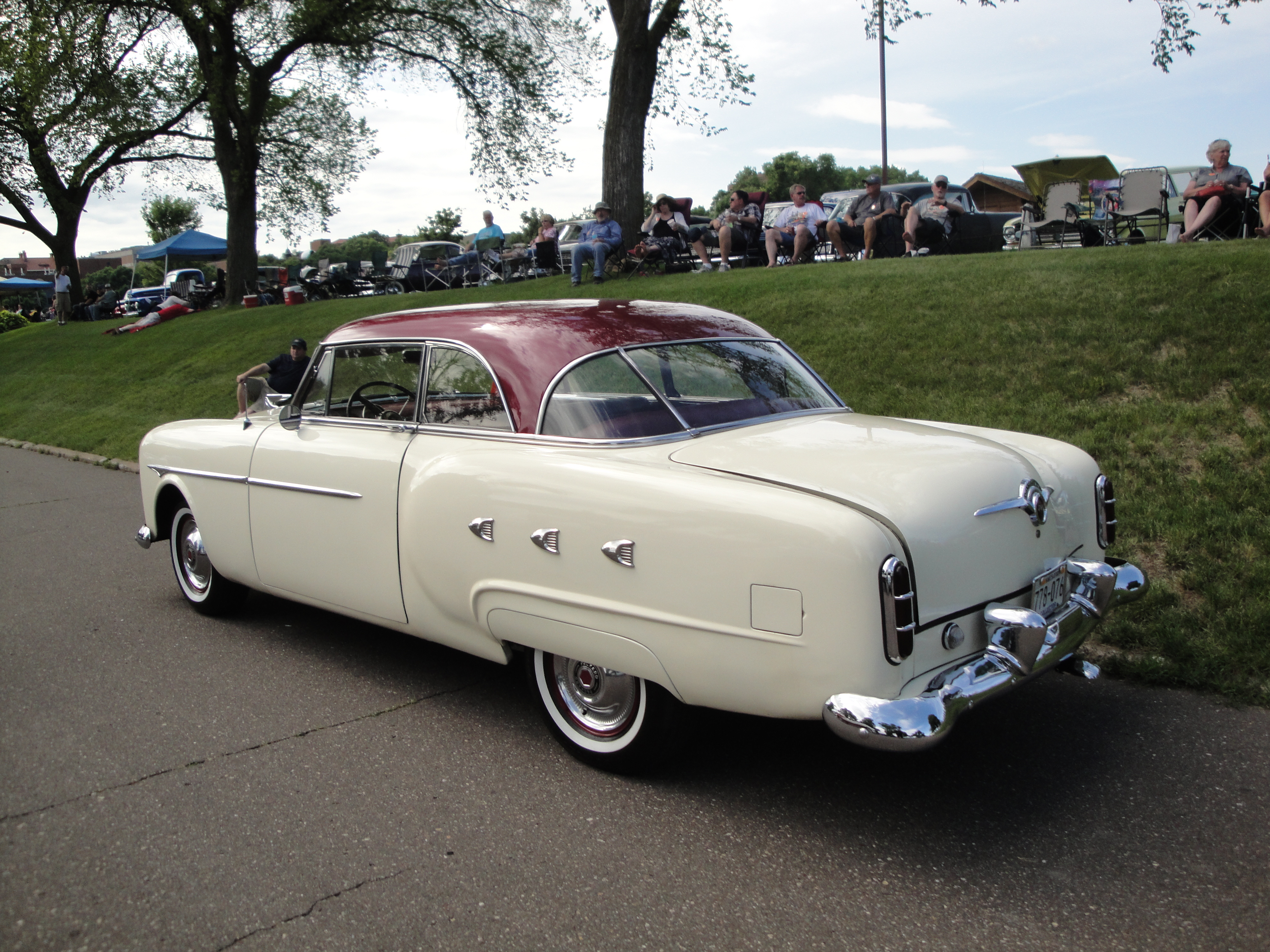
1952 Packard Mayfair (rear)

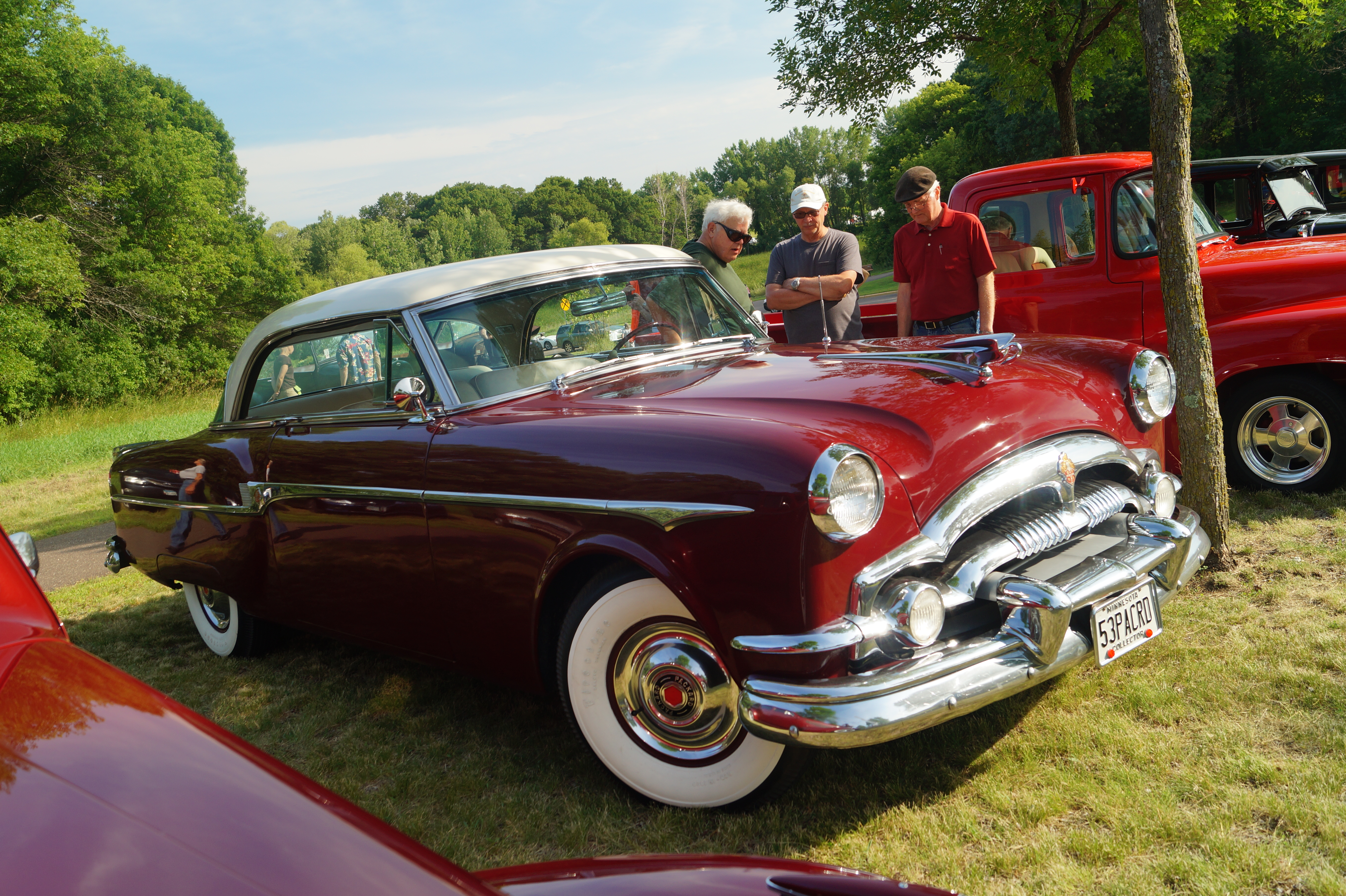
1953 Packard Mayfair

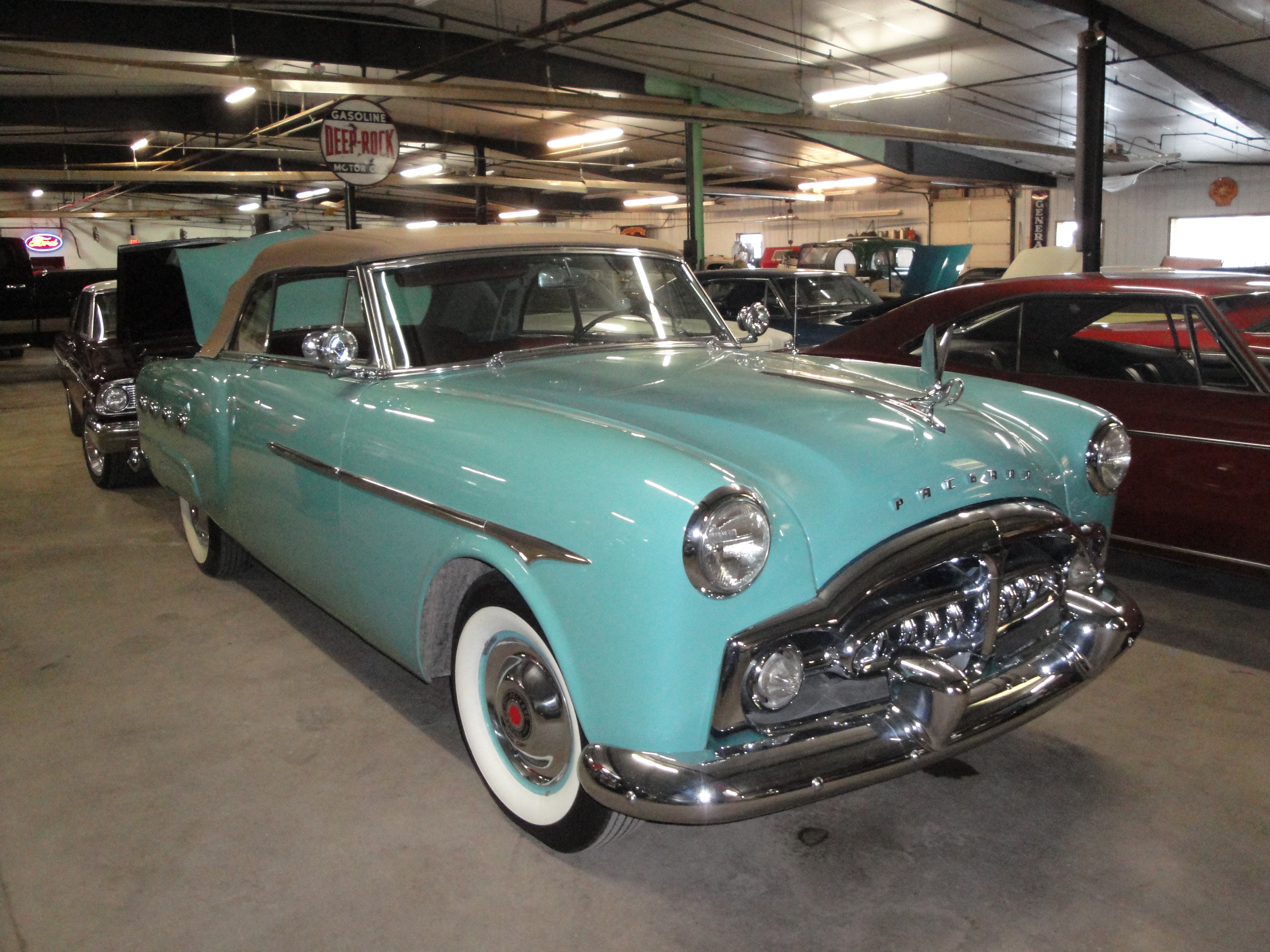
1951 Packard 250 Convertible

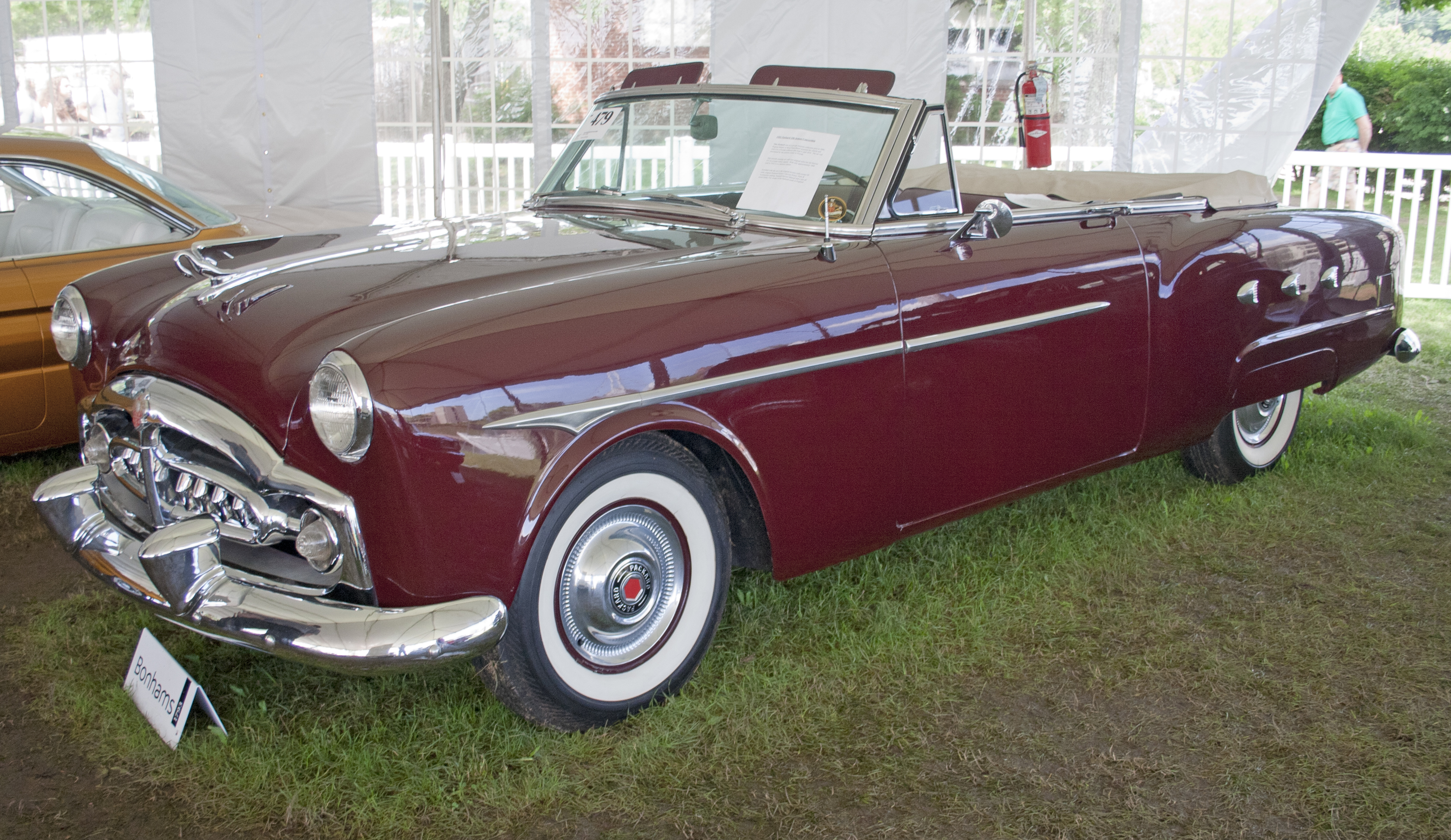
1952 Packard 250 Convertible

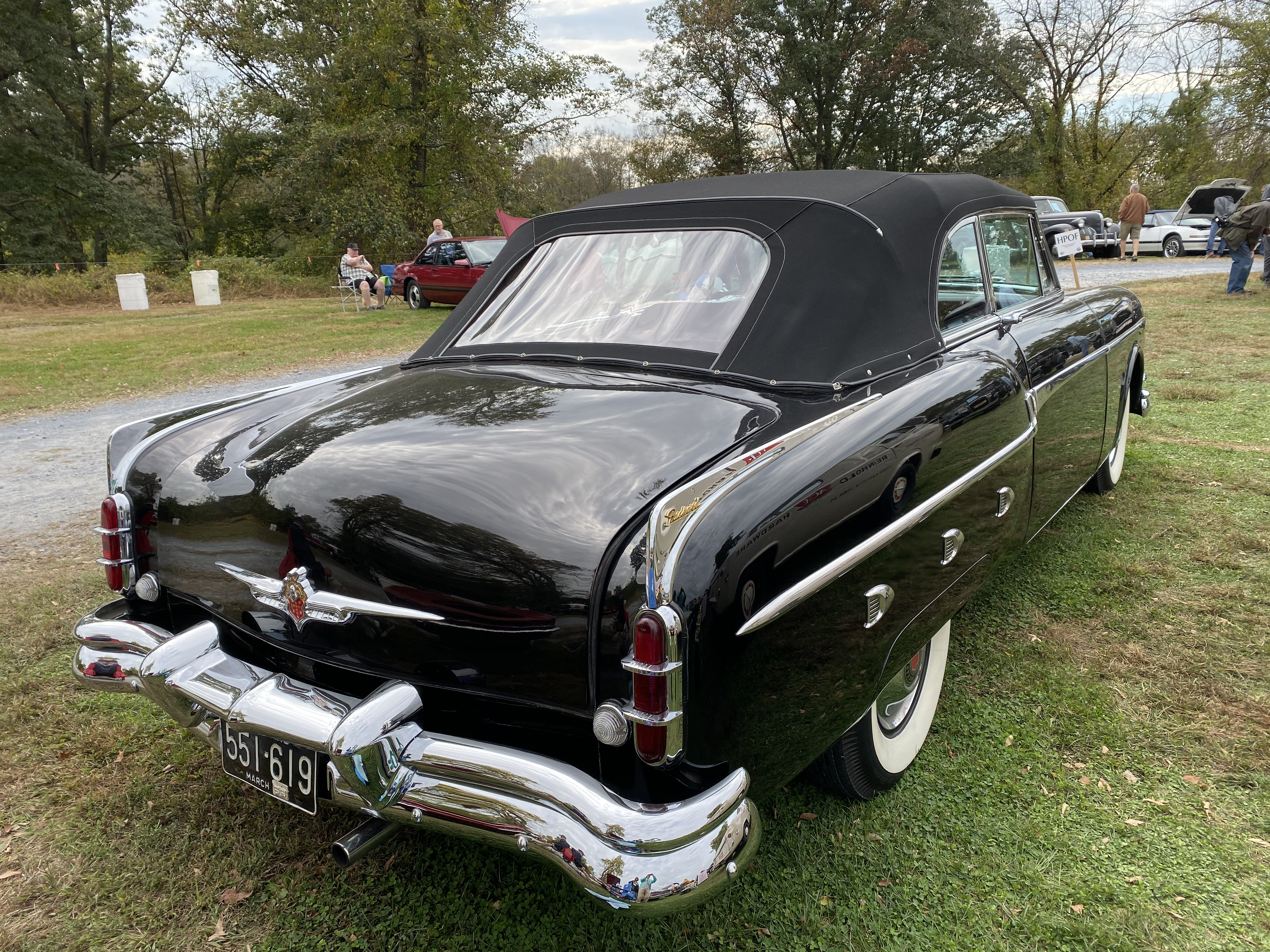
1953 Packard 250 Convertible

Packard 250 Series
Year	hardtop and convertible
1951	4,640
1952	5,201
1953	6,668
