= Packard Pacific =

Series 5431
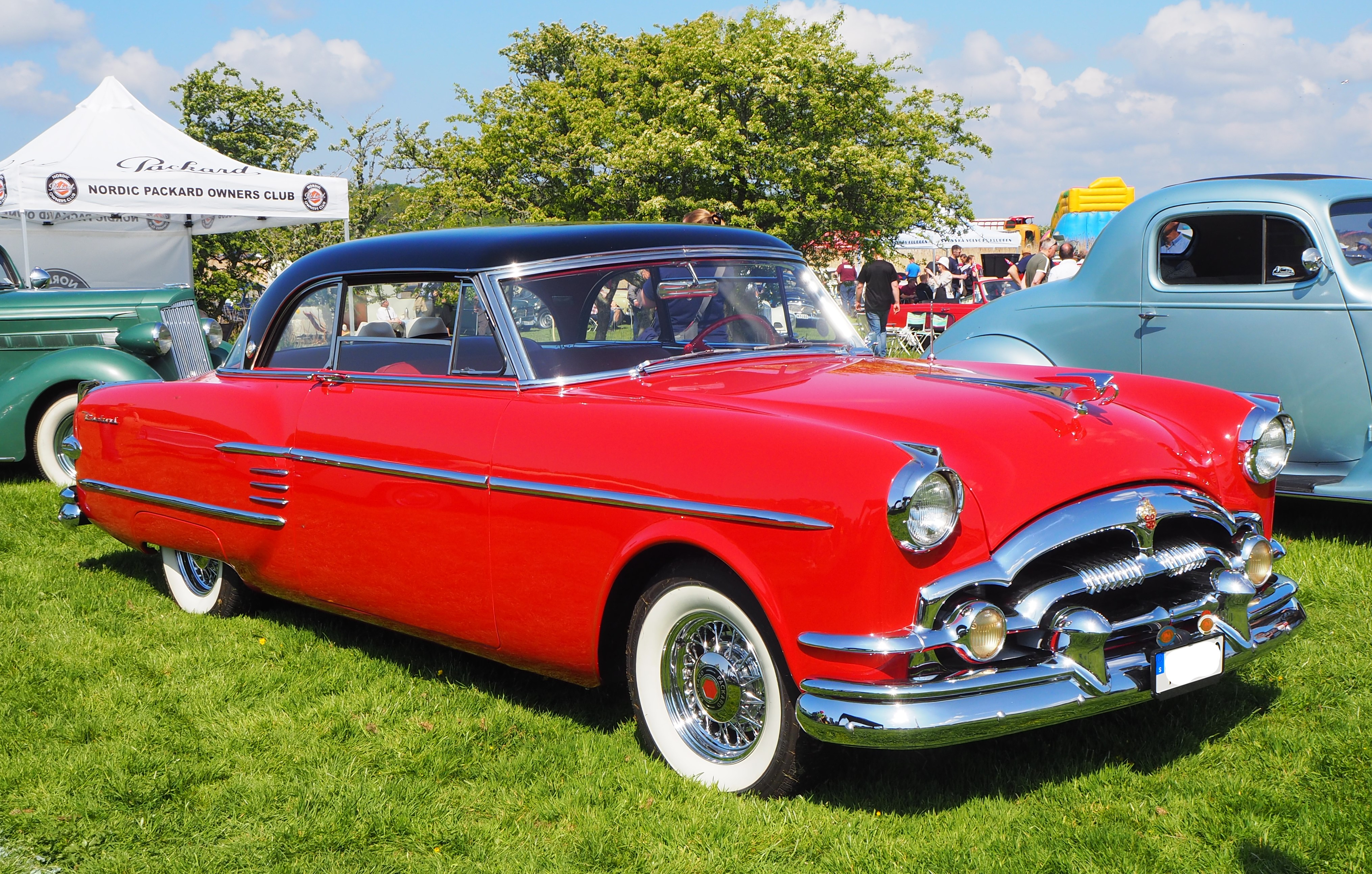
- 1954 Packard Pacific

Overview
- Manufacturer: Packard
- Model years: 1954
- Assembly: Packard Automotive Plant, Detroit, Michigan, United States

Body and chassis
- Class: Full-size luxury car
- Body style: 2-door hardtop
- Layout: Front-engine, rear-wheel-drive
- Related: Packard Caribbean; Packard Patrician

Powertrain
- Engine: 359 cu in (5.9 L) 4-bbl. L-head I8 (212 hp)
- Transmission: 2-speed Ultramatic automatic 3-speed manual w/overdrive

Dimensions
- Wheelbase: 122 in (3,099 mm)
- Length: 211.5 in (5,372 mm)
- Width: 77.9 in (1,979 mm)
- Height: 62 in (1,575 mm)
- Curb weight: 4,040 lb (1,833 kg)

Chronology
- Predecessor: Packard Mayfair
- Successor: Packard Four Hundred

The Packard Pacific is an automobile manufactured by the Packard Motor Car Company of Detroit, Michigan for the 1954 model year. It replaced the Mayfair and was sold exclusively as a two-door hardtop.

In the early 1950s, Packard used a numeric naming scheme that designated Packard's least expensive models as the Packard 200 and 200 Deluxe, while two-door hardtops and convertibles were designated Packard 250 and its mid-range sedan the Packard 300. For model years 1951 through 1953, the 250 hardtop was named the Mayfair; for model year 1954 only, the hardtop was given the model name Pacific.

The Mayfair, Packard's first hardtop offering, was created for the 1951 model year in order to keep in competition with the Oldsmobile 98 Holiday, Buick Roadmaster Riviera, Lincoln Capri and Chrysler New Yorker Newport hardtop coupes. The Mayfair was named after the exclusive Mayfair district of London.

When the hardtop was renamed as the Pacific, Packard associated the model with its senior level, personal luxury car offering, the Caribbean. Both the Mayfair and Pacific shared the same flat-head straight-eight engines (a 327-cubic inch for the Mayfair and a 359-cubic inch for the Pacific) with top-of-the-line, or "senior" Packards, but used the shorter 122-inch (3,100 mm) wheelbase of the "junior" models. The Pacific came standard-equipped with Packard's Ultramatic automatic transmission., while a four-way power seat, power steering, power assist "Easamatic" brakes, heater and windshield defroster, chrome cormorant hood ornament, and power windows were available as extra cost options.

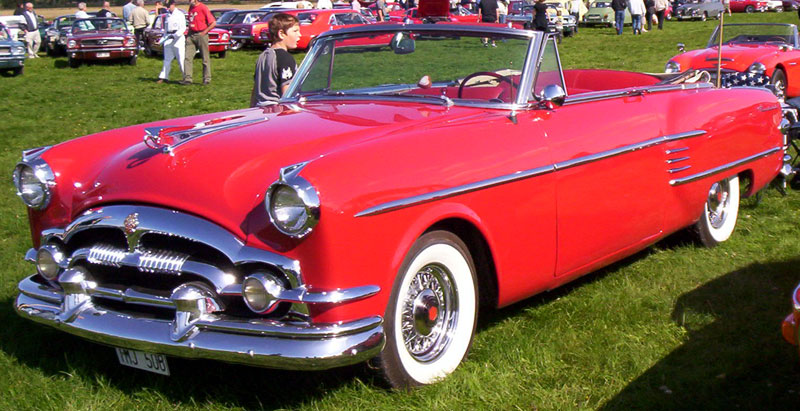
1954 Packard Convertible

The body style was also used as a convertible, while the name Pacific was used exclusively for the hardtop. The convertible, labeled as the Model 5479 saw 683 manufactured with a retail price of $3,939 ($46,121 in 2024 dollars) while the hardtop was offered at $3,827 ($44,810 in 2024 dollars).

The Pacific was distinguished by high levels of interior trim: for instance, leather upholstery was provided, and the cars' interior headliners were ornamented with chrome strips intended to suggest a convertible top. The cars were also given innovative exterior color schemes; most were given two-tone paint jobs (for example: "Carnation" (white) and "Amethyst" (lavender)), which were considered fashionable at the time.

1,189 Pacific hardtops were built before production concluded for the 1954 model year. Starting in 1955, Packard renamed its senior hardtop the Four Hundred. Production was hampered by the sale of Briggs Manufacturing Company who had supplied bodywork to Packard beginning in 1941.
