= Packard Patrician =

Full-size luxury car

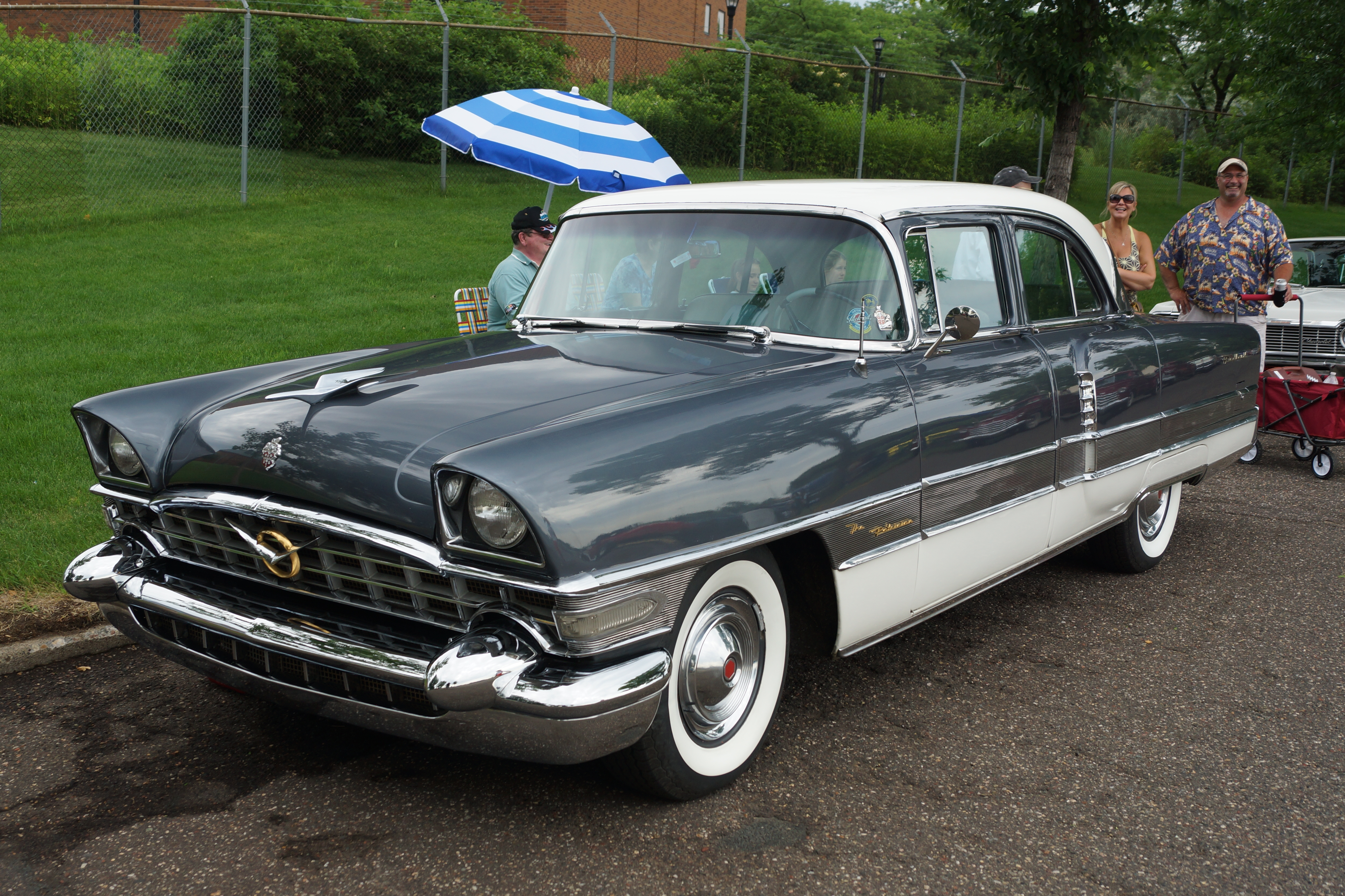
- 1956 Packard Patrician

Overview
- Manufacturer: Packard
- Production: 1951–1956
- Assembly: Packard Automotive Plant, Detroit, MI

Body and chassis
- Class: Luxury car
- Body style: 4-door sedan

Chronology
- Predecessor: Packard Custom Super Eight

The Packard Patrician is an automobile which was built by the Packard Motor Car Company of Detroit, Michigan, from model years 1951 through 1956. During its six years in production, the Patrician was built in Packard's Detroit facilities on East Grand Boulevard. The word "patrician" is Latin for a ruling class in Ancient Rome. It was the last "senior level" Packard until production ended in 1958.

The Patrician was the last of the "senior Packards" and was briefly available as an extended length limousine for 1953 and 1954 called the Corporate Executive which found few buyers.

== 1951–1952 ==
1951–1952
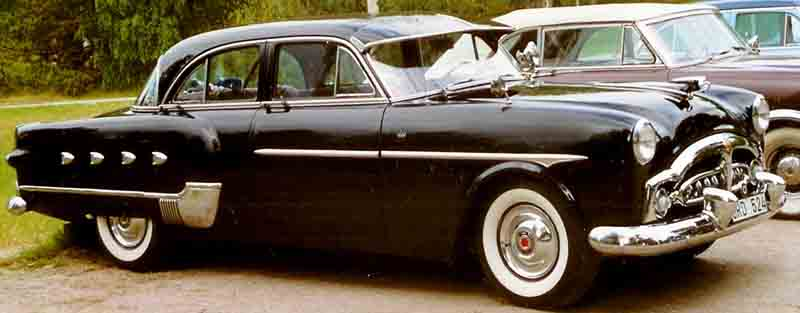
- 1952 Packard Patrician 400

Overview
- Manufacturer: Packard
- Production: 1951–1952
- Designer: John Reinhart

Body and chassis
- Body style: Sedan
- Layout: FR
- Related: Packard Mayfair

Powertrain
- Engine: 327 cu in (5.4 L) Packard straight-eight
- Transmission: 2-speed Ultramatic automatic

Dimensions
- Wheelbase: 127.0 in (3,226 mm)
- Length: 219.7 in (5,580 mm)
- Width: 78.3 in (1,989 mm)
- Height: 62.2 in (1,580 mm)

Chronology
- Predecessor: Packard Custom Super Eight

In 1951 and 1952, the automaker attempted to use a numeric naming structure that designated Packard's least expensive models as Packard 200 and 200 Deluxe while two-door hardtop and convertibles were designated Packard 250 and its mid-range sedan the Packard 300.

The highest trim level available was the Packard Patrician 400 which replaced the previous model year's Custom Super 8 model range. It was easily identified from other Packards by its stainless steel trim, including a brightwork extension on the top rear fender referred to as "the fishtail". In 1951 the model featured three chrome ports on its rear fenders and in 1952 the car featured four chrome ports, a styling approach similar to GM's Buick luxury vehicles. 300s and 400s also sported a slightly revised grille which included chrome "teeth" in its oval area in 1951. That change occurred to the 250 series soon after introduction.

When the Packard body style was updated for 1951, the door handle was concealed and aligned with the chrome beltline that surrounded the side windows, bottom of the windshield and rear window.

The Patrician 400 was available only as a premium four-door sedan, outfitted with high-grade upholstery and chrome trimming within. For the 1952 model year, Packard retained the services of noted interior decorator Dorothy Draper to bring a fresh look to the interior color scheme. Wilton carpeting and hassock-style rear passenger foot rests were also included with the car. With a list price of $3,662 ($45,423 in 2025 dollars) it also was the most expensive senior Packard offered. The automobile rode upon a 127 in (3,226 mm) wheelbase shared only with the 300 sedan. All other Packards had a wheelbase of 122 in (3,099 mm).

Power still came from Packard's venerable 327 cu in (5.4 L) in-line eight-cylinder engine, delivering 150 bhp (112 kW). The Patrician's iteration of the 327 featured nine main bearings instead of five as in other models, without increase in power.

Until 1954, Henney built a few nine-passenger Executive Sedans and Corporate Limousines on a chassis with 148 in (3,759 mm) wheelbase. Derham in Rosemont built very few Patrician Custom Formal Sedans with leather padded roofs, small backlights and elaborate interiors on the standard Patrician frame.

Introduction of the Patrician 400 was, together with most other Packards (250s were delayed), in August 1950. Production totals for 1951 came to 9,001 Patrician 400 units, and 3,975 units for 1952.

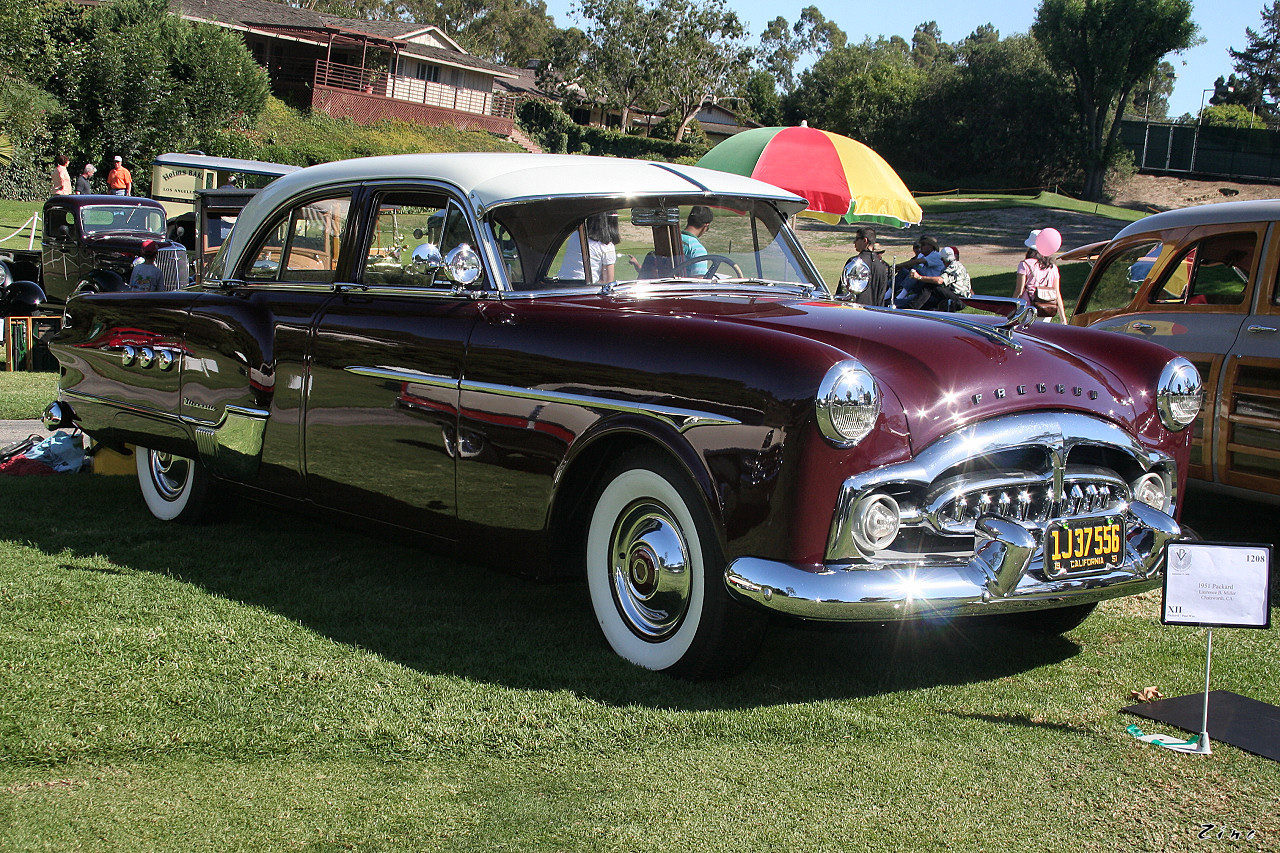
1951 Packard Patrician 400

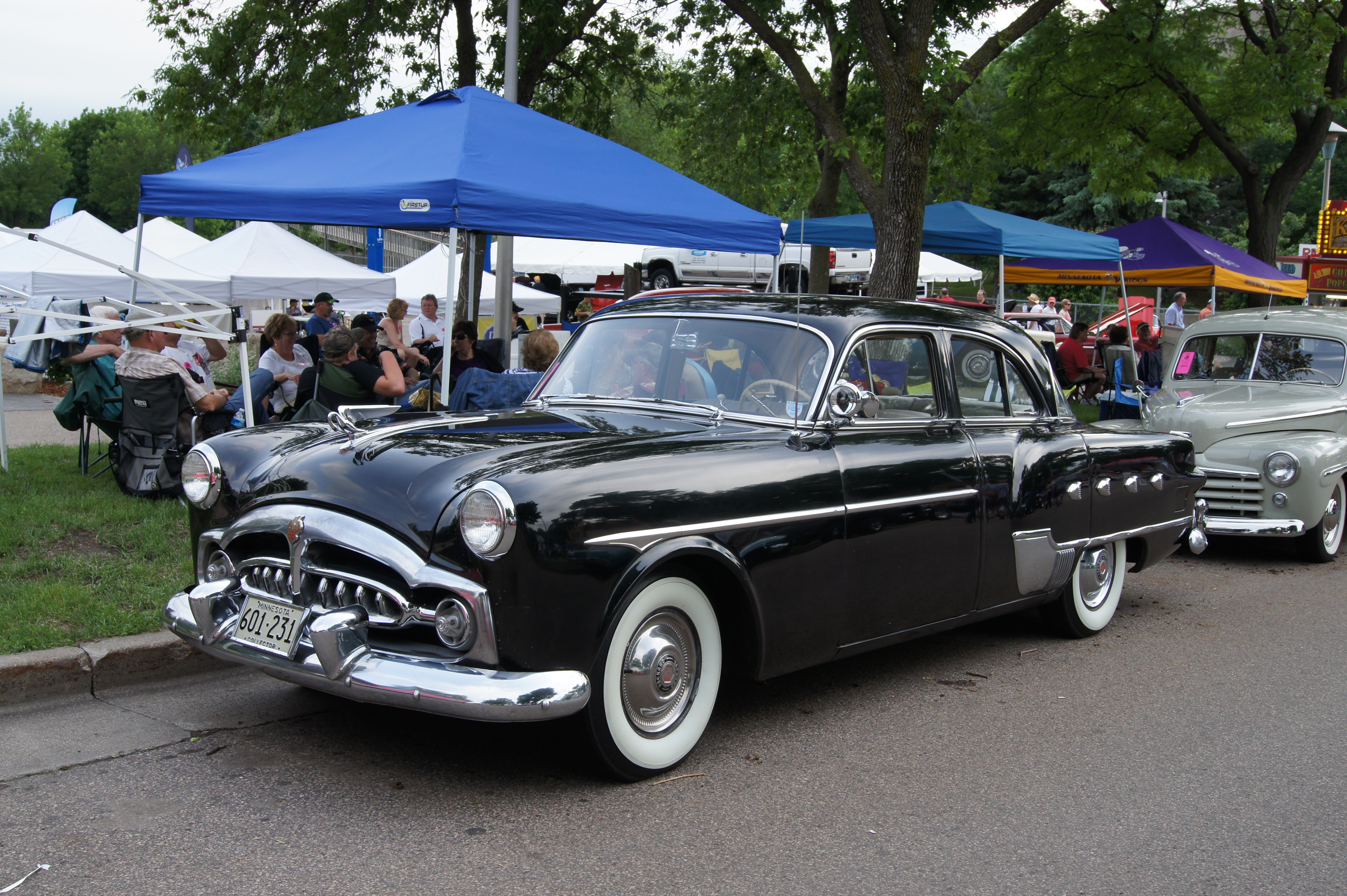
1952 Packard Patrician 400

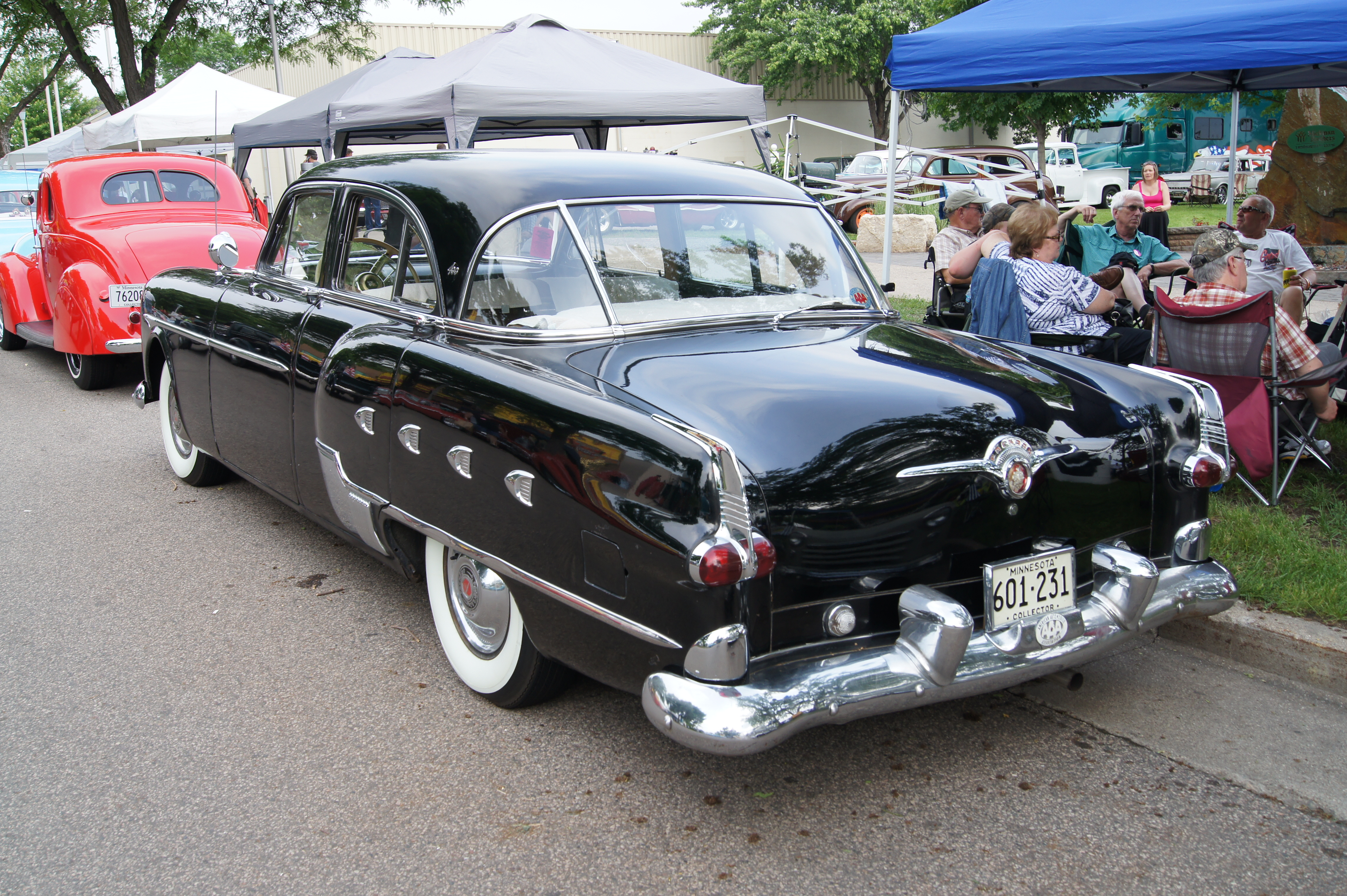
1952 Packard Patrician 400 (rear)

== 1953–1954 ==
1953-1954
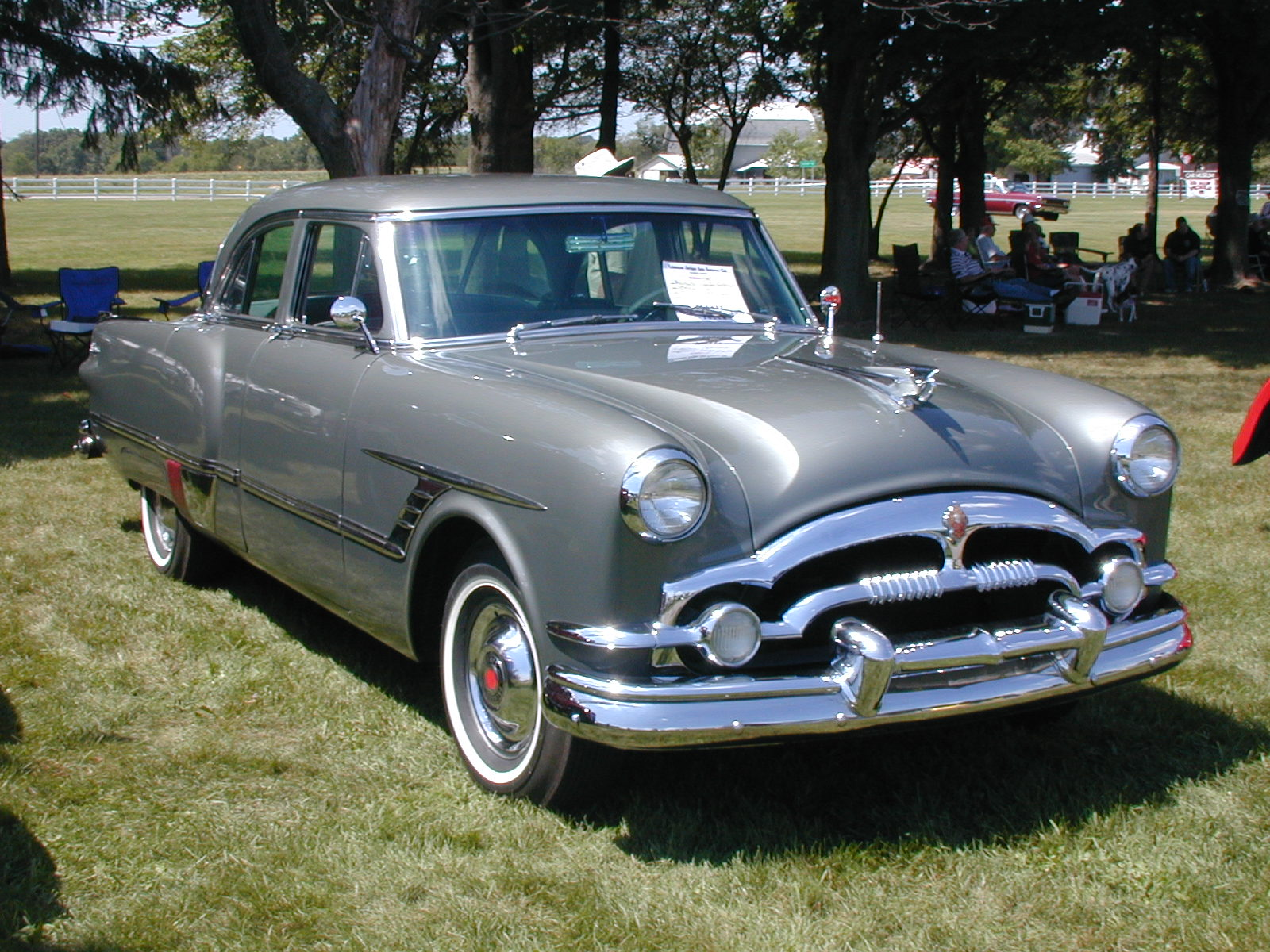
- 1953 Packard Patrician

Overview
- Manufacturer: Packard
- Production: 1953–1954
- Designer: John Reinhart

Body and chassis
- Body style: Sedan
- Layout: FR
- Related: Packard Caribbean; Packard Pacific

Powertrain
- Engine: 327 cu in (5.4 L) Packard straight-eight
- Transmission: 2-speed Ultramatic automatic

Dimensions
- Wheelbase: 127 in (3,226 mm) (sedan); 149 in (3,785 mm) (limousine)
- Length: 218.2 in (5,542 mm) (sedan); 240.2 in (6,101 mm) (limousine)
- Width: 77.9 in (1,979 mm) (sedan & limousine)
- Height: 62.9 in (1,598 mm) (sedan & limousine)
- Curb weight: 4,335 lb (1,966 kg) (sedan); 4,720 lb (2,140 kg) (limousine)

The "400" designation was removed for the 1953 model year, and the Patrician continued to represent Packard's highest trim level sedans. It rode on the 127 in (3,226 mm) wheelbase chassis. The Patrician also was used for the basis of the custom bodied Henney passenger models, including the 149 in (3,785 mm) 8-passenger Packard Executive Sedans and Limousines, the difference being that the latter had a partition window between the front and rear compartments. During these years the Patrician received annual trim changes and improvements associated with model-year change-overs in the 1950s. The 1953 Packard Patrician 4-door sedan was listed at US$3,740 ($45,006 in 2025 dollars) while the all-new Packard Corporate Executive 8-passenger 4-door limousine was listed at US$7,100 ($85,438 in 2025 dollars).

The Henney professional cars (hearse, ambulance, flower car, service car) built on the 156 in (3,962 mm) wheelbase commercial chassis generally used Patrician-like trim except for 1954, which used Cavalier-like trim, and was offered in a hardtop body style called the Packard Pacific. Since the professional cars were fully coachbuilt bodies (not conversions) built on Packard's separate commercial chassis, their trim level had little to do with the Patrician except for the general appearance. The Henney Junior, a short-wheelbase hearse or ambulance was built on the standard Cavalier-Patrician chasses (but with stronger, heavy-duty rear suspension) but had the 5-main bearing Cavalier engine rather than the 9-main bearing engine of the Patrician.

For 1953, the Patrician used the same 327-cubic-inch (5.4 L) 9-main bearing straight eight engine that used for 1951 and 1952 but for the first time added a four barrel carburetor for an increase in power, along with the availability of optional power steering and "Easamatic" power brakes. For 1954, the new 359-cubic-inch (5.9 L) 9-main bearing, aluminum head 212 hp (158 kW) engine was standard and also featured a 4-barrel carburetor. 1954 was the first year to add a start-position to the ignition key - earlier years were started by a switch built into the carburetor which was actuated by depressing the accelerator pedal to the floor.

A general description implies that all Patrician models were fitted out with standard equipment when in fact they could be built to order. If a customer wanted a manual transmission then that is what he or she would be given by the factory.

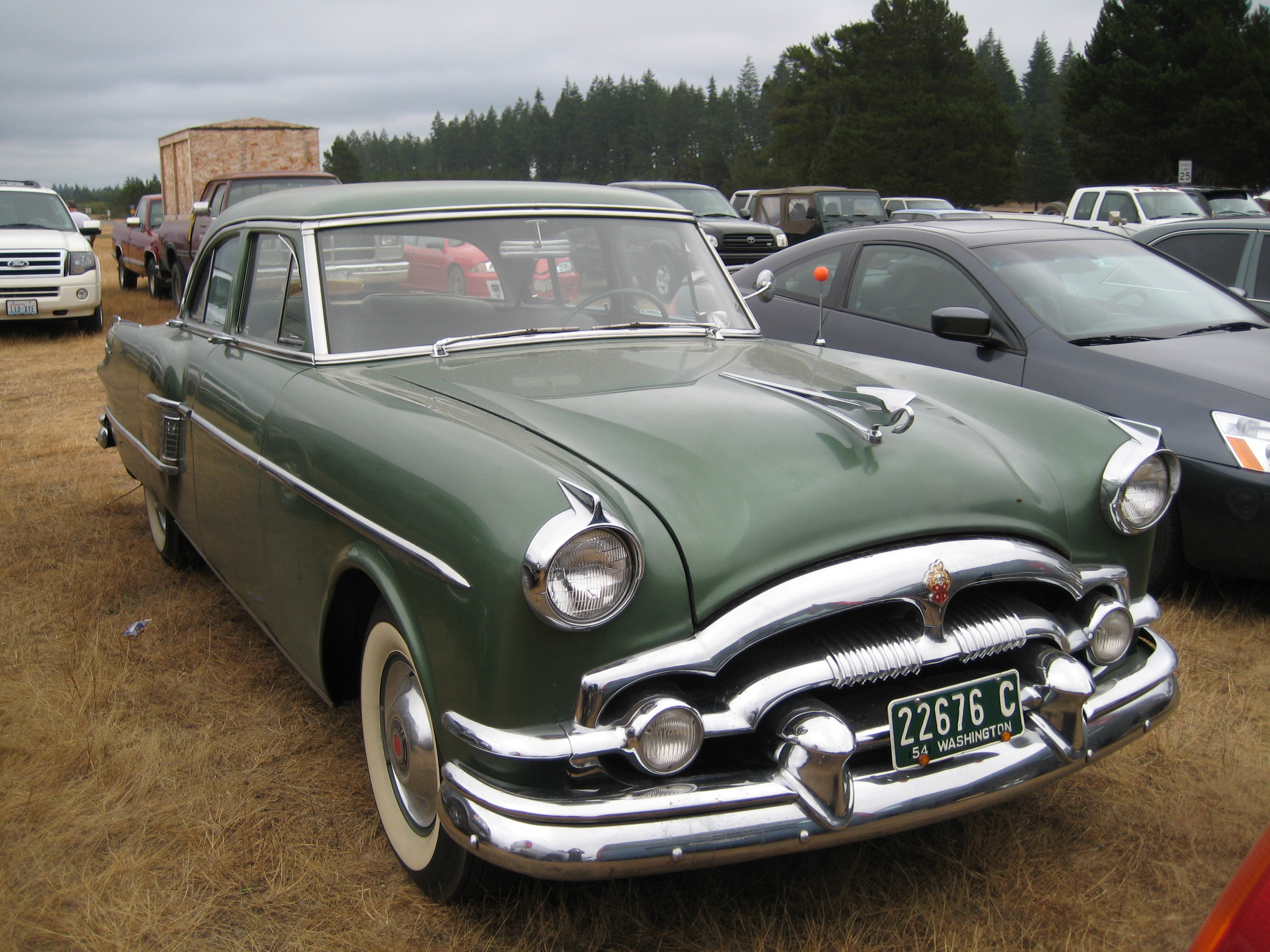
1954 Packard Patrician

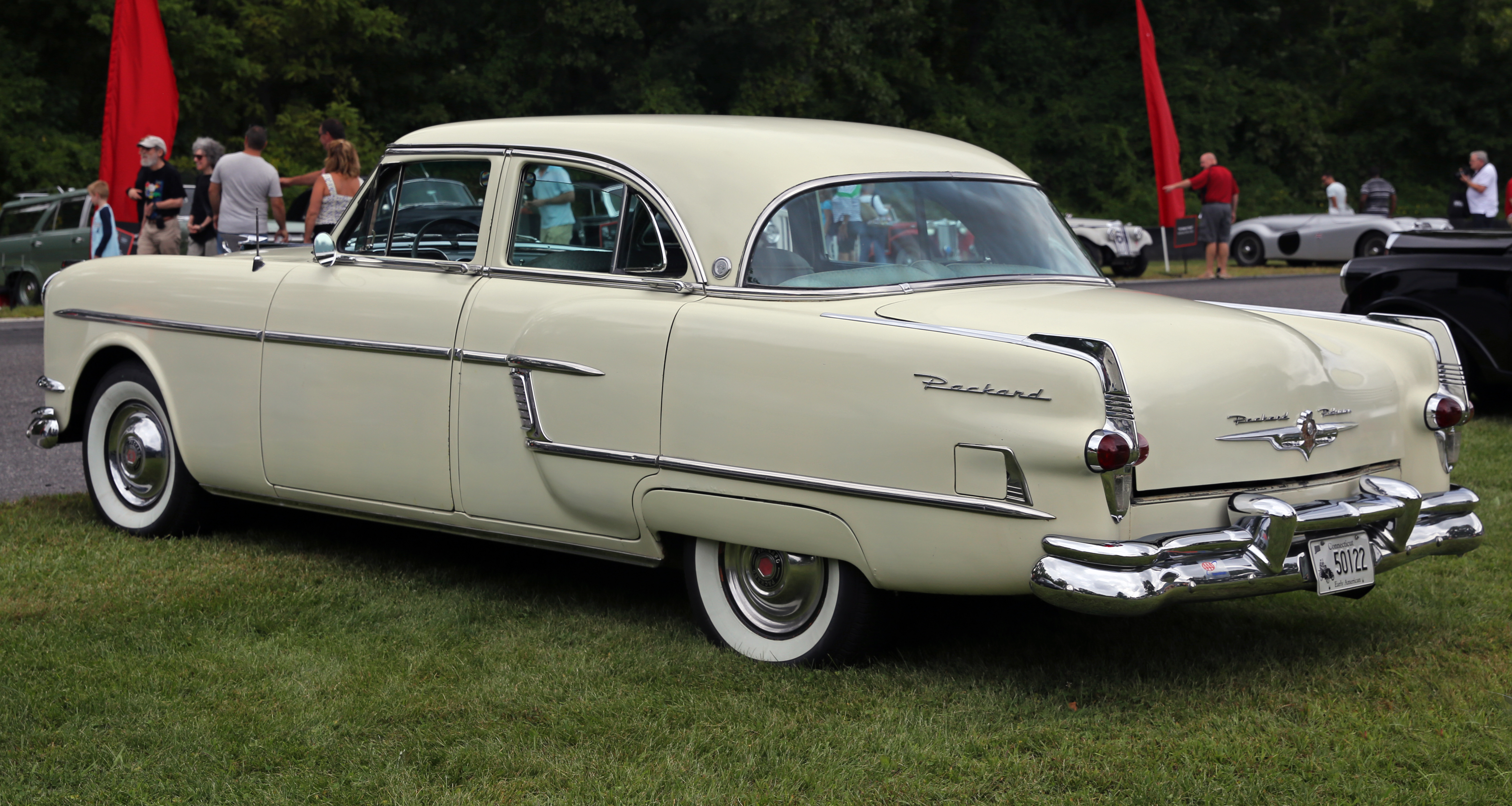
1954 Packard Patrician (rear)

== 1955–1956 ==
1955–1956
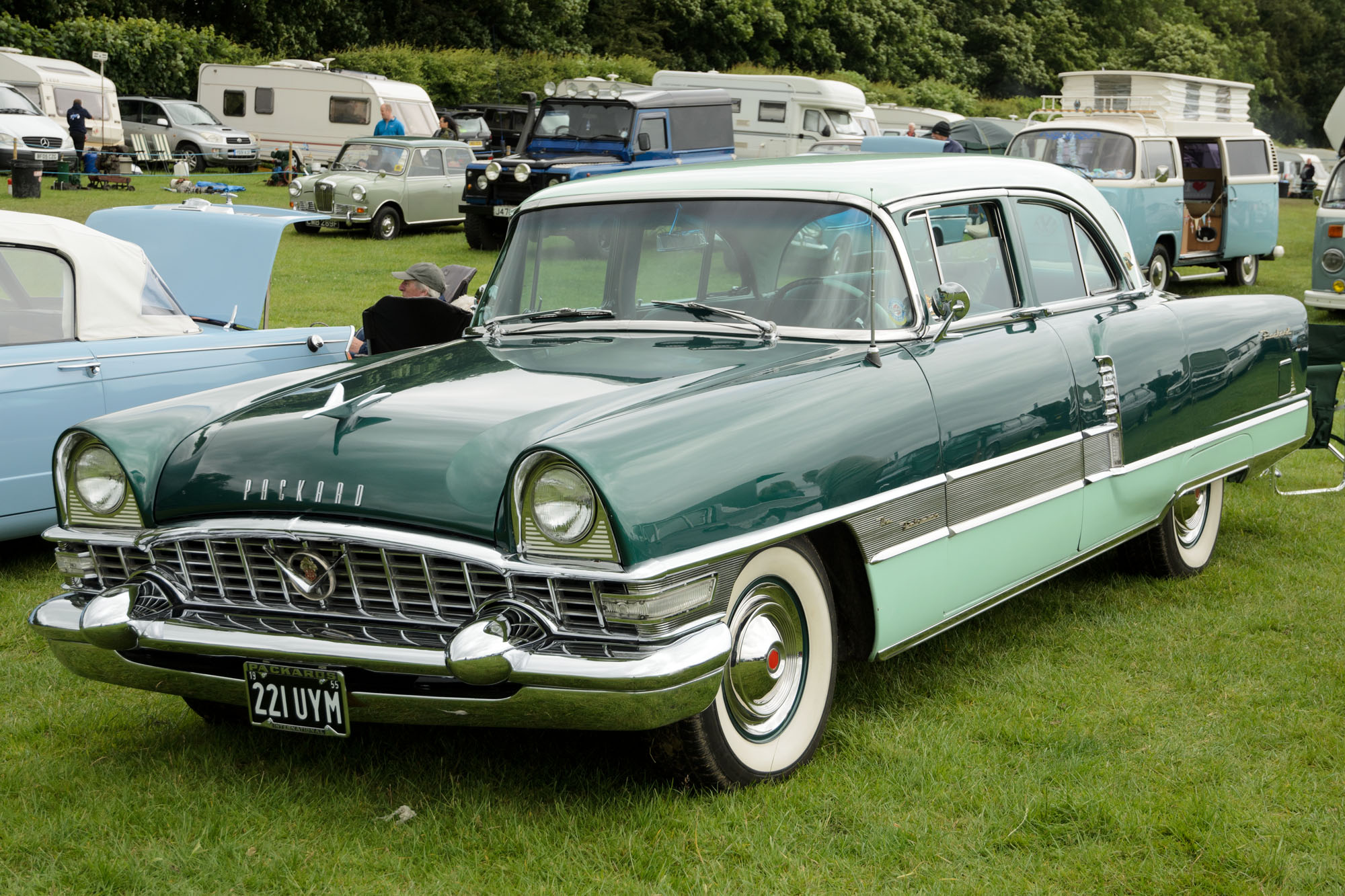
- 1955 Packard Patrician

Overview
- Manufacturer: Packard
- Production: 1955–1956
- Designer: Dick Teague

Body and chassis
- Body style: Sedan
- Layout: FR
- Related: Packard Four Hundred

Powertrain
- Engine: 374 cu in (6.1 L) Packard V8
- Transmission: Twin-Ultramatic

Dimensions
- Wheelbase: 127 in (3,226 mm)
- Length: 219.7 in (5,580 mm)
- Width: 78.3 in (1,989 mm)
- Height: 62.2 in (1,580 mm)
- Curb weight: 4,552 lb (2,065 kg)

For 1955, the entire senior line of Packards received an extensive design update that freshened the last restyling that was done in 1951. Under designer Dick Teague, the Senior Packards received a more modern grille design, "Cathedral"-styled rear tail lights, hooded headlight housings and a new exterior trim layout that afforded Packard the ability to offer two- and three-tone paint combinations with the simplest of masking patterns. While Packard could not afford a whole new greenhouse for the passenger compartment, new trim at the base of the rear pillar made it look like it had a redesigned roofline. The cars were also outfitted with a wrap-around windshield, thus bringing it in line with American automobiles of the era. Inside, upholstery and bright work was also freshened and the cars received a new dashboard layout. 1955 and 1956 instruments and controls were similar, but the 1955 dash featured a warm, bronze-like surface, and in 1956 were faced with a machined-look stainless steel facing. The 1955 Patrician was listed for US$3,890 ($46,752 in 2025 dollars).

For 1955, the Patrician was offered as a four-door sedan only and Packard produced 9,127 of the cars. It was also the year that the company introduced their only V8 engine. For 1956, minor appearance changes included a revised headlight housing that exaggerated the front peak further forward. The area around the headlight was painted black to give the effect of greater depth. The car also received a different grille texture. During the 1956 model year, 3,375 Patricians rolled off Packard's production line before the model was dropped by the ailing carmaker.

The final Packard built (that was a true Packard and not a badge-engineered Studebaker President) was a black Patrician sedan that rolled off the Packard assembly line on June 25, 1956. It was shipped to a dealership in Guntersville, Alabama, and its fate is not known.

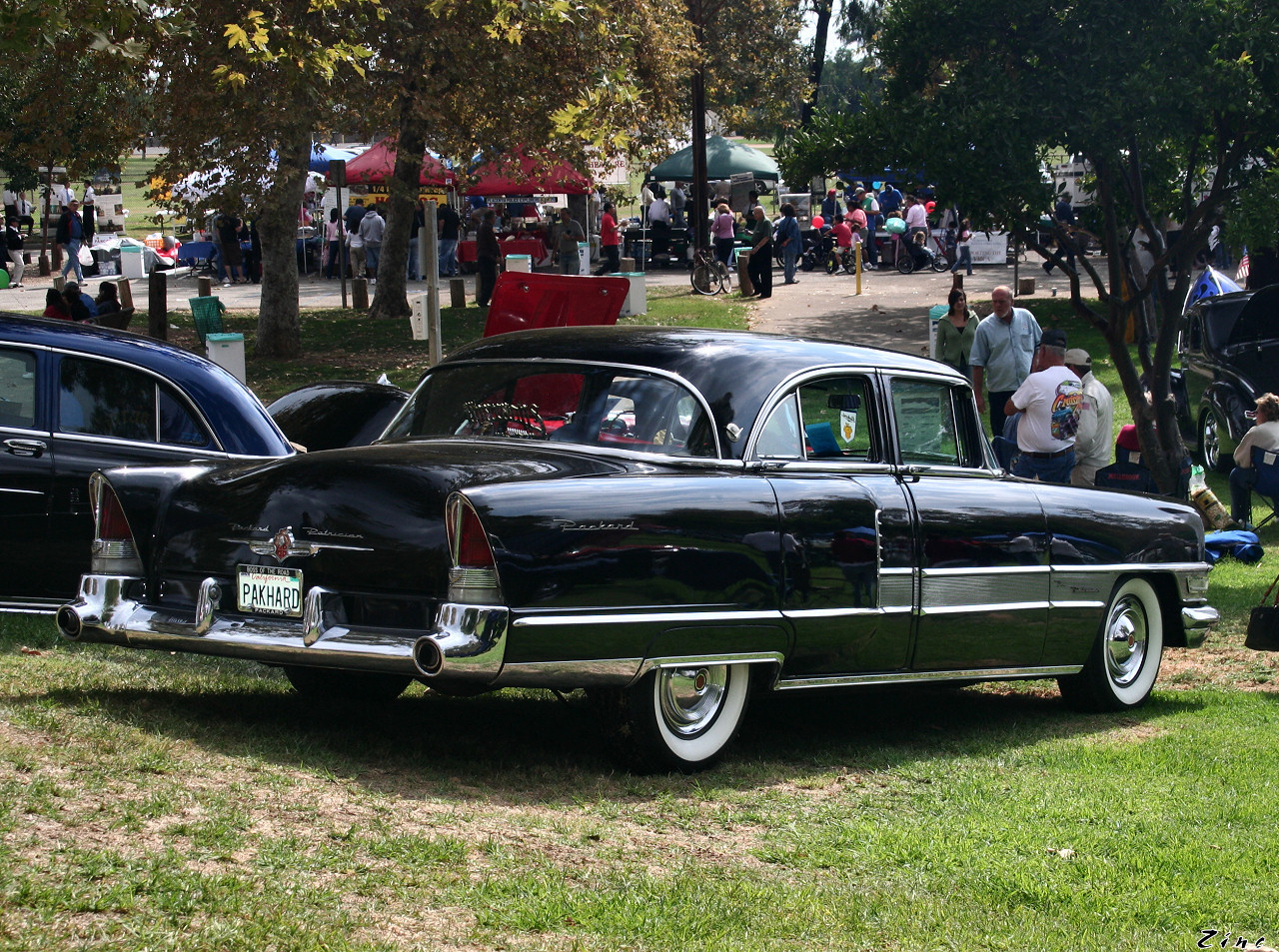
1955 Packard Patrician (rear)

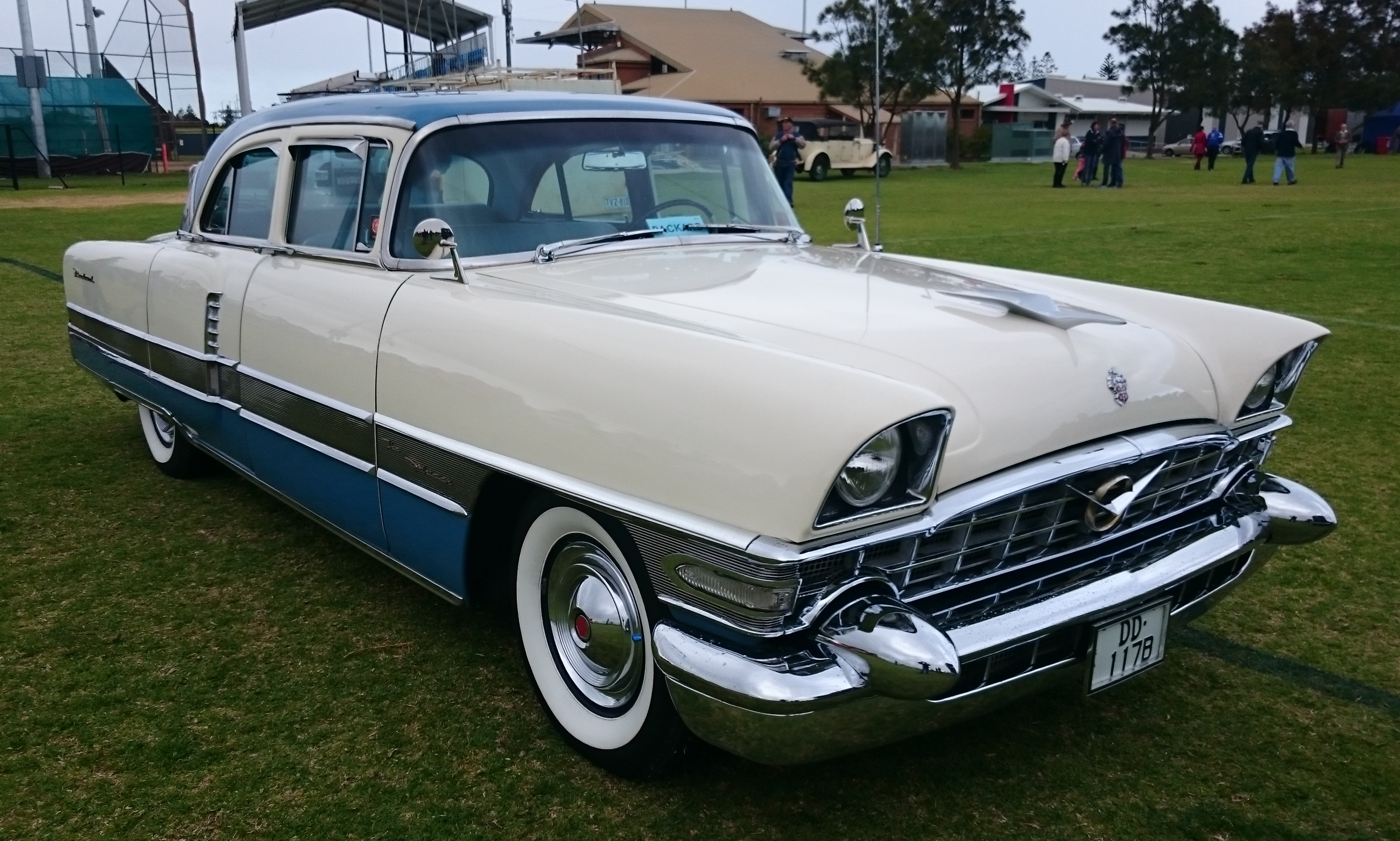
1956 Packard Patrician
