= Ultramatic =

Trademarked name of the Packard Motor Car Company's automatic transmission

Ultramatic was the trademarked name of the Packard Motor Car Company's automatic transmission introduced in 1949 and produced until 1956, at Packard's Detroit, Michigan, East Grand Boulevard factory. It was produced thereafter from late 1954, through 1956 at the new Packard "Utica" Utica, Michigan facility.

== 1935–1948: Development ==
Packard's Ultramatic transmission was the creation of the company's chief engineer Forest McFarland and his engineering team. The magnitude of this accomplishment is illustrated by the fact that it was the only automatic transmission developed and produced solely by an independent automaker, with no outside help. Devices like the Ultramatic were being tested and designed by Packard from 1935 on, but none satisfied the perfectionist engineer. The Ultramatic's development was halted, as was all automotive work during World War II, but resumed in earnest during 1946.

After World War II, Packard's range had contracted to variants of the mid-priced Clipper line. It was during this period that Packard began to suffer in competition with General Motors' Cadillac Division, thanks in part to their popular self-shifting Hydra-Matic. The Hydra-Matic was available starting in 1941 and became very popular during the 1946–1948 time-frame, pushing along Packard's release of its new automatic drive. Packard at that time (1946–1949) offered only an Electromatic Vacuum Clutch option, which required manual shifting otherwise. As with most vacuum powered shifting and clutching devices, Electromatic was overall generally unreliable.

Finally, in mid 1949, Packard's 50th Anniversary, McFarland's Ultramatic Drive became available as a $199 option ($2,693 in 2025 dollars). It was first offered only on the top-line Packard Customs, following in 1950 by the entire lineup.

== 1949–1954: Ultramatic Drive ==
The first Ultramatic Drive was a hydraulic torque converter automatic transmission with a two-speed plus reverse epicyclic geartrain, with torque converter lockup, called "Direct Drive" by Packard. The unit was fully hydraulically controlled with a "valve body," like most early automatic transmissions before the advent of electronic control.

The original Ultramatic did not switch automatically between high and low gearing ratios. The driver selected "high-range" or "low-range" ratios through the column shift lever. The intention was that in normal driving, the high (1:1) ratio would be selected at all times, and the two stage, dual turbine torque converter (actually a total of four turbines were employed) was used to reduce gearing for starting off. At a speed of 15–56 mph (24–90 km/h) (depending on rear axle ratio which affected the rate of governor pressure rise), hydraulic pressure overcame the opposing throttle pressure, as determined by carburetor linkage position, causing the Direct Shift Valve to apply the direct drive clutch. This "locked" the torque converter, giving direct mechanical drive from the engine to the rear wheels. This became the Ultramatic's definitive feature, eliminating the power-robbing slippage of the torque converter at cruising speeds. On the highway, the Ultramatic delivered the same economy and power as a manual transmission. With the exception of Borg-Warner, in their Studebaker "Automatic Drive", major automotive manufacturers did not generally employ a locking torque converter until nearly thirty years later.

The low ratio was available for climbing and descending hills. When using the low ratio, the torque converter lockup happened at a slightly lower speed, and as a result of the reduction in the rate of the opposing throttle advancement, it helped to eliminate torque converter overheating issues that plagued early automatic transmissions, which because of this advancement were avoided in similar conditions with Ultramatic.

Ratio selection was through a column shift, with a lighted selector quadrant on the steering column showing the range. The positions available were Parking, Neutral, High, Low and Reverse (PNHLR).

After its first year, the Ultramatic Drive became available on all Packard models, and was immediately popular. It continued on, with a Packard program of modifications to improve reliability until 1954, although it was mostly trouble free from the start.

In 1954, Ultramatic underwent a major upgrade to both the power transfer and hydraulic control components, which were reconfigured to give low gear starts automatically in the newly added "Drive" (D) range. Many Packard owners had complained of lackluster acceleration with the earlier Ultramatics, and had discovered that starting off in Low ratio, and switching to High while on the move gave a much brisker pickup. Ultramatic Drive, while durable, handled this manual shift from low to high poorly.

To further illustrate the necessity of this feature, by 1954 both the Borg-Warner and Chevrolet PowerGlide in addition to the aforementioned Hydra-Matic and Chrysler's new PowerFlite performed ratio switches automatically as well (low-to high), while Buick's Dynaflow Drive continued using high gear starts until its demise after the 1963 model year.

== 1954: Gear-Start Ultramatic Drive ==
Packard's new Ultramatic model introduced in the middle of the 1954 model year was officially called Gear-Start Ultramatic Drive, offering a new selector sequence on the column shift: 'D', for Drive, placed in between High and Low, with High now represented by a simple dot (PN•DLR). In this new DRIVE range, it would use the low ratio and torque converter to start off, switching to the high ratio and ultimately to direct drive as the car accelerated, effectively automating what many Packard drivers had been doing manually with the older Ultramatic Drive.

During 1954, and into 1955, Packard Motor Car Company, later Studebaker-Packard, went on a modernization spree of its aging facilities. It was decided by Packard President James J. Nance (1952–1956), and his manufacturing Vice-President, Ray Powers (1954–1956), that their East Grand Boulevard complex was no longer able, due to age and deterioration of that facility, to be further modified to handle the expected increase in production for the company in 1955 and beyond. A new facility was therefore planned and built for use by Packard as a transmission and engine facility in Utica, Michigan. This facility was actually built on the N/E corner of Packard Proving Ground Complex on Van Dyke Rd. The facility was sided by both 22 Mile Rd, and Mound. After completion, Packard moved the machinery, and production line for the Ultramatic, as well as its yet to be introduced V-8 engine during the summer and early fall of 1954. This facility therefore produced all 1954 "Gear-Start", 1955 "Twin-Ultramatic", and 1956 Ultramatic derivatives through the fall of 1956 when this facility was deactivated and sold as part of a corporate buyout deal with the Curtiss-Wright Company.

== 1955: Twin-Ultramatic Drive ==
In 1955, Packard replaced its long-running straight-8 engine range with an all-new V8 design, and launched a new evolution of its automatic transmission at the same time: the Twin-Ultramatic Drive. McFarland, his assistant John DeLorean, and their team had not been satisfied with the improved pick-up of the Gear-Start Ultramatic, and modified the angle of the converter "pump" to allow a higher stall speed thus increasing the torque multiplication better suited to the torque curve of the new V8 engines. In addition, a slightly higher stall converter was produced for the sportier Caribbean model due to its use of two four-barrel carburetors. The Gear-Start's ability to start in low range and switch to high automatically was retained, but the selector quadrant indicator was altered and PN•DLR became PN'D'LR to better reflect the dual drive range capability of this transmission, all the better to compete with the Dual-Range Hydra-Matic. Functionality was the same; the first Drive position, to left of the 'D equated to High on the Gear-Start Ultramatic, while the second, situated to the right of D', was equivalent to the Drive position on the Gear-Start, giving the driver the option of starting in either High or Low with automatic upshifts, ending with Direct Drive engagement of the torque converter, thus the Twin- designation referred to this dual Drive capability.

The Twin-Ultramatic suffered many "teething problems" when introduced, which did significant damage to Packard's reputation for quality and reliability. However, over the years it's become clear that Packard's initial Twin Ultramatic problems were not out of line with any other new contemporary designs and the engineering department's program of running changes and updates greatly increased its functionality, excepting driver abuse through excessive application of the higher torque V8's power potential. Lower-powered models in the Packard range and those sold to American Motors suffered fewer problems. Exacerbating the difficulties, Packard was hemorrhaging experienced dealerships, which meant that many 1955 Packards were not being maintained to the previous high standards.

Packard offered Twin-Ultramatic in the Packard Clipper, Packard Four Hundred, Packard Patrician, and Packard Caribbean ranges, and sold Twin-Ultramatics to American Motors for use along with their 320ci V8 in top-of-the-line Nash Ambassador and Hudson Hornet models for 1955.

== 1956: Ultramatic and Touch Button Ultramatic ==
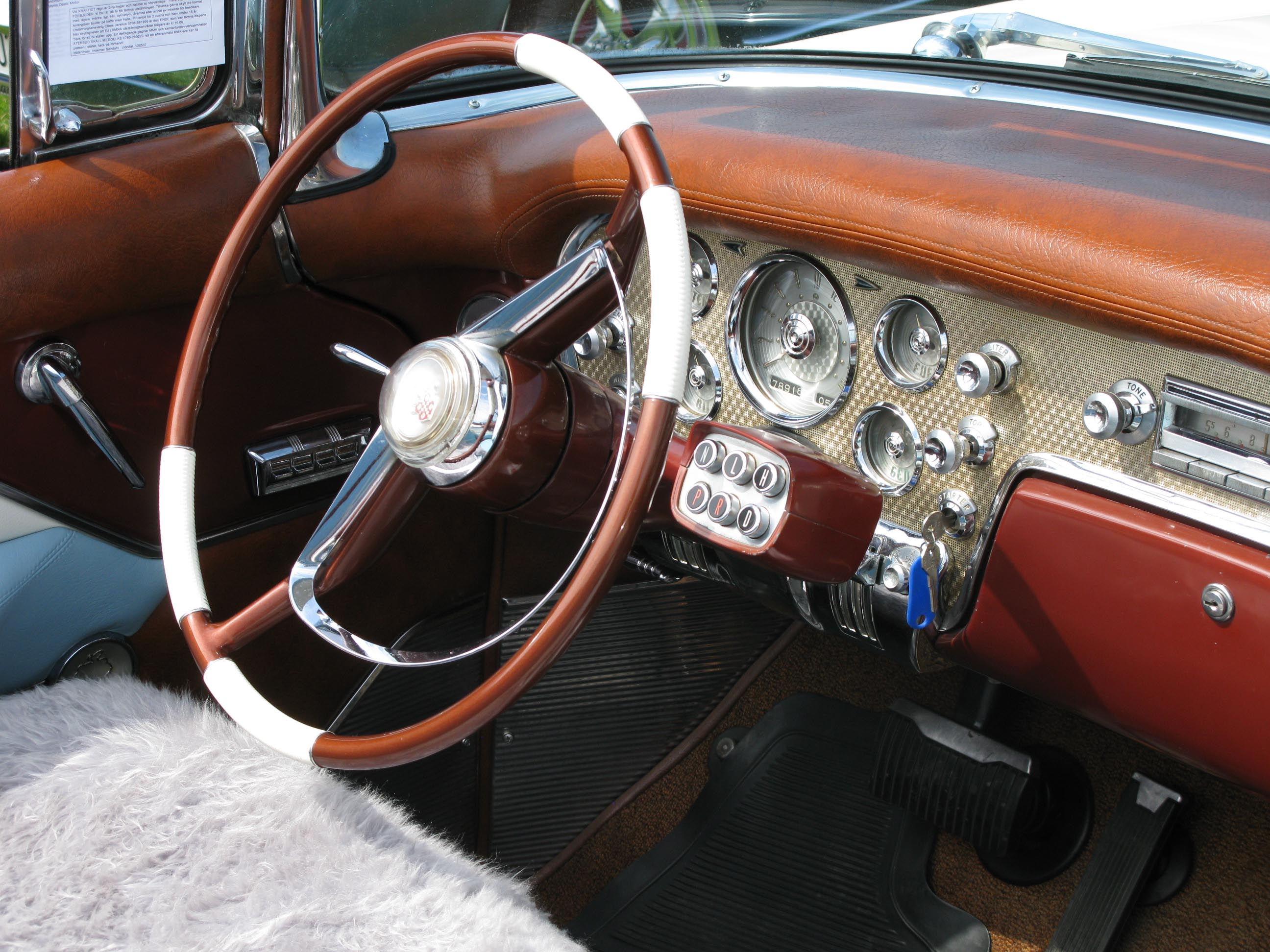
The column-mounted push button selector box for the Touchbutton Ultramatic in a 1956 Caribbean.

The year 1956 saw a major redesign of a majority of the individual transmission components, including re-calibration of the shift pattern that produced an improvement of shift control. In addition, there was a nomenclature change which reverted to the original Ultramatic Drive brand name. This year also saw the selector quadrant undergo yet another change to a PNHDLR pattern in order to further clarify the two drive ranges and accommodate the soon to be released push button control pod. In addition, General Motors threatened lawsuits regarding Packard's marketing of "dual drive ranges." Despite its completely different design, GM had been marketing a "Dual-Range Hydra-Matic Drive" since 1953, which also used dual drive range selector pattern.

In addition, small but important changes to shift linkages, better build quality, and stricter tolerances restored Packard levels of reliability to the 1956 transmission. Also new that year was an aluminum transmission casing, making the Ultramatic 90 lb (41 kg) lighter than its competition, including the newly launched push-button Chrysler PowerFlite. Future transmissions from all manufacturers were to follow Packard's lead.

Ultramatic Drive was offered on the Packard Patrician, Packard Four Hundred, and after its introduction in early 1956, the Packard Executive. It was also available in all Clipper models, which were sold as a separate marque for 1956. They were also supplied to American Motors along with 352ci V8 engines for use in the Nash Ambassador and Hudson Hornet until AMC replaced Packard's V8 and Ultramatic Drive with their own V8 and Borg-Warner automatic at midyear. Packard also supplied Ultramatic Drive transmissions to its corporate partner Studebaker for use in the 1956 Studebaker Golden Hawk, which also used the Packard 352ci V8 engine.

Packard decided to offer a push-button gear selector for the 1956 series called "Touch Button Ultramatic". Mounted in a rectangular control pod at the end of a thick arm stemming from the right side of the steering column, the Touch Button Ultramatic gear selector used six buttons in two rows of three: The bottom row of buttons offered Park, Reverse, and Drive, while the top row contained the Neutral, Low, and High buttons.

The system was electrically actuated, rather than Chrysler's very reliable mechanical pushbuttons, and was troublesome from the beginning. The electric shift motor, essentially a modified starter motor, proved insufficient to move the car out of Park on a steep hill, and would pop the circuit breaker; electrical contact problems, wiring problems and other issues were prevalent even when new, and worsened with age. Later models saw system improvements. When the contract was cancelled after Packard production ceased, Auto-Lite destroyed the tooling, making spare parts for the system unobtainable.

Touch Button Ultramatic was standard only on the 1956 Packard Caribbean, and a $52 option for the Packard Patrician, Packard Four Hundred, and Packard Executive. It was also available in all Clipper models. It was not offered in AMC or Studebaker models using Packard engines.

Although Detroit-based Packard production ceased after the 1956 model year, Studebaker-Packard Corporation continued to fulfill service obligations to Packard owners, and servicing the 1955 Twin-Ultramatic and 1956 Touchbutton Ultramatic were a continuing liability for the company after the Packard range was discontinued.

== Historical perspective ==
Packard's successful development of its own automatic transmission was unique, as no other independent automaker managed such a feat. The company's worsening financial situation, particularly after its merger with Studebaker, made keeping up with competitors' automatic transmission developments particularly difficult. Packard's attempts to update the Ultramatic in 1954, 1955, and 1956, were not sufficiently tested to eliminate teething troubles at launch. Improvements had to be made as running changes, which damaged the company's once sterling reputation for quality and reliability.

Packard's use of a locking torque converter was not only up to date, but more advanced than its competition at the time. However, the company did not take advantage of the opportunity to supply Ultramatics to Lincoln, Nash, Hudson, and Kaiser-Willys in the wake of the 1953 fire at the Livonia, Michigan GM Hydramatic plant that stopped GM's supply of the transmissions, when the aforementioned marques were left searching for other suppliers. However, Packard would learn from this mistake the following year, when Nash and Hudson merged to form American Motors in May 1954. Packard agreed to supply AMC with its new 320ci V8 and Twin Ultramatic transmission for 1955 in the latter company's top-line Nash Ambassador and Hudson Hornet ranges, giving both models the modern V8 engine option they desperately needed in order to keep pace with the Big Three. This agreement continued into the 1956 model year, as Packard supplied AMC its 352ci V8s equipped with the newly renamed and refined Ultramatic Drive units for the Ambassador and Hornet, but was canceled midway through the year. Unfortunately, a contract dispute and personality conflicts between George Romney at AMC and James Nance at Studebaker-Packard, led to AMC developing and launching their own, in-house AMC V8 engine range backed by automatic transmissions supplied by Borg-Warner beginning at midyear in 1956. Packard would supply Ultramatic Drive units to Studebaker for use in the 1956 Golden Hawk as a $100 option, as that model came standard with Packard's 352ci V8 engine. Unfortunately, no higher-volume Studebaker models would use either the Packard V8 or Ultramatic Drive before Curtiss-Wright ended production of both in 1956.

Despite the problems of later versions, the transmission worked beautifully under the use conditions it was designed for. Packard's Gear-Start Ultramatic (1954), Twin Ultramatic (1955), and Ultramatic Drive (1956), struggled to reliably automate the low to high gear shift transition. Adding a poorly timed high clutch application and low band release over much of the allowable up-shift range resulted in many premature high clutch failures. This situation resulted in an unusual sensitivity to individual driving habits determining useful clutch life. Therefore, while the transmission was designed to physically accept a high torque V8, its control system needed further development. Packard's plans for upgrading the Ultramatic Drive further were in development for 1957 and beyond. These plans were shelved, however, when Studebaker-Packard was taken over by Curtiss-Wright in Spring 1956. Curtiss-Wright's management permanently discontinued Ultramatic production and sold the plant and tooling to raise cash for the beleaguered company at the same time they shut down production of Packard cars in Detroit.

With no Packard V8s or Ultramatic transmissions being made thereafter, Studebaker would replace the 1956 Golden Hawk's Packard V8 with a supercharged version of its own 289ci V8, and its accompanying Ultramatic Drive was replaced by Borg-Warner's Flightomatic transmission, beginning in the 1957 model year. This powertrain combination would also be used on the 1957 and 1958 Packard ranges of Studebaker-based models, in lieu of the Packard V8 and Ultramatic.
