= Nash Ambassador =

Large-sized cars produced by Nash Motors Corporation

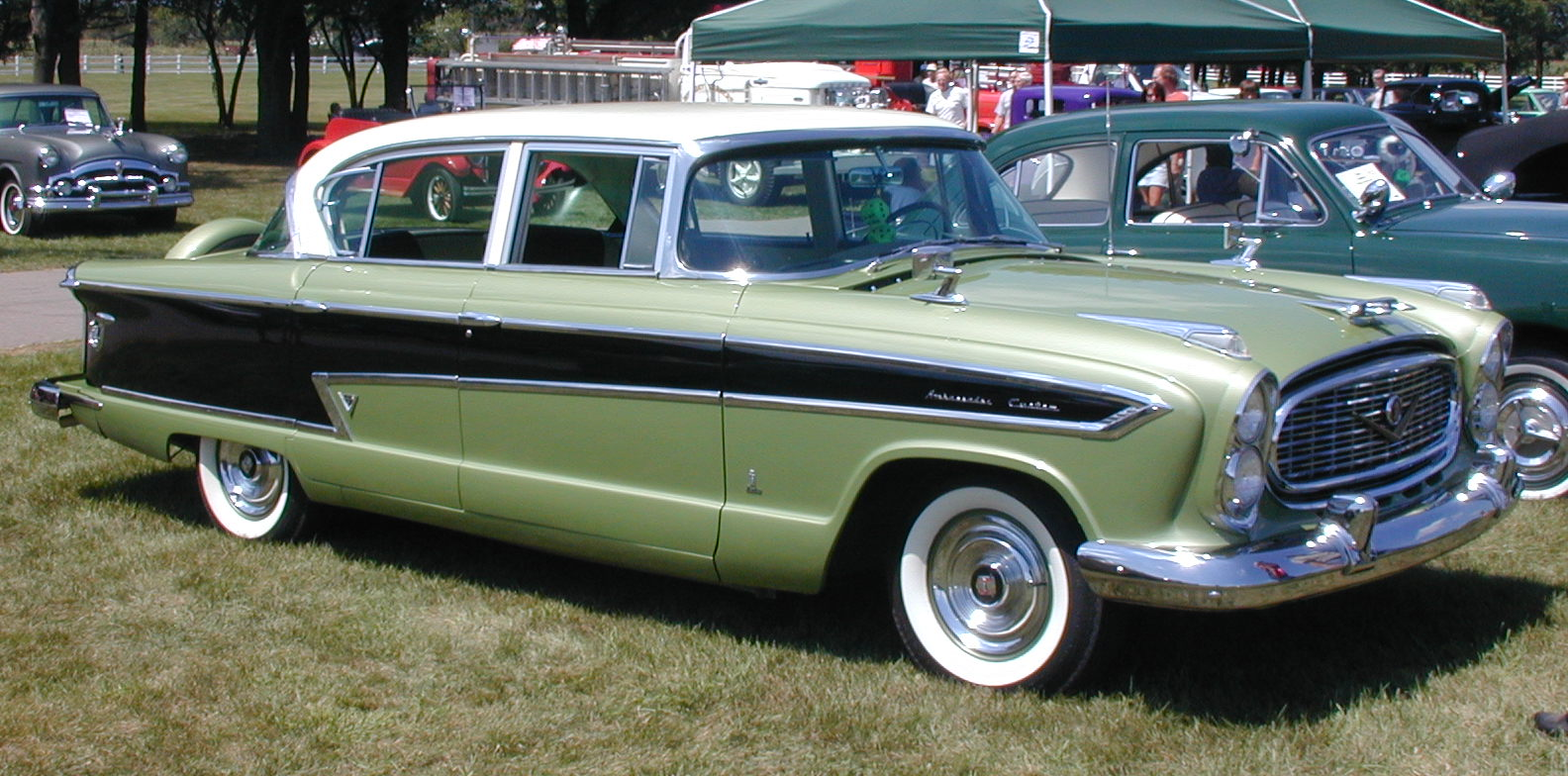
- 1957 Nash Ambassador

Overview
- Manufacturer: Nash Motors (1932–1954); American Motors Corporation (1954–1974)
- Production: 1927–1957
- Assembly: United States: Kenosha, Wisconsin; Australia

Chronology
- Successor: AMC Ambassador

The Nash Ambassador is a full-size automobile produced by Nash Motors from 1927 until 1957. It was a top trim level for the first five years, then became a standalone luxury model from 1932 onwards. These Ambassadors included high levels of design, equipment, and construction, earning them the nickname "the Kenosha Duesenberg".

Between 1929 and 1934, Nash also produced a line of seven-passenger sedans and limousines. The Ambassador series was the Nash's "flagship" car. This positioning remained following the merger of Nash with Hudson Motor Car Company in 1954 that formed the American Motors Corporation (AMC).

The ongoing use of the Ambassador model name by Nash, and then its successor AMC versions built through the 1974 model year, made it "one of the longest-lived automobile nameplates in automotive history" as of the late 1970s.

== 1927-early 1932 ==
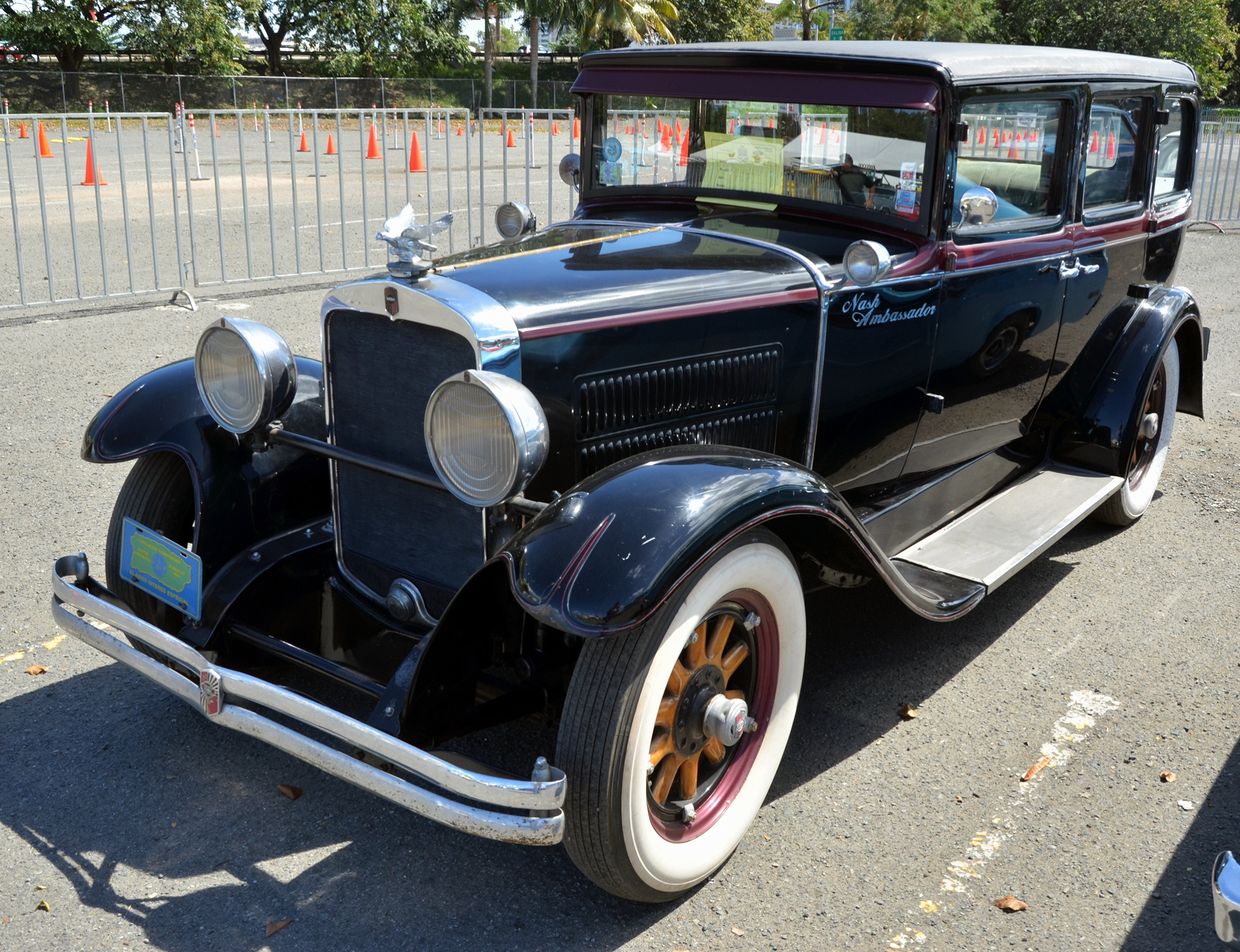
1929 Nash Ambassador

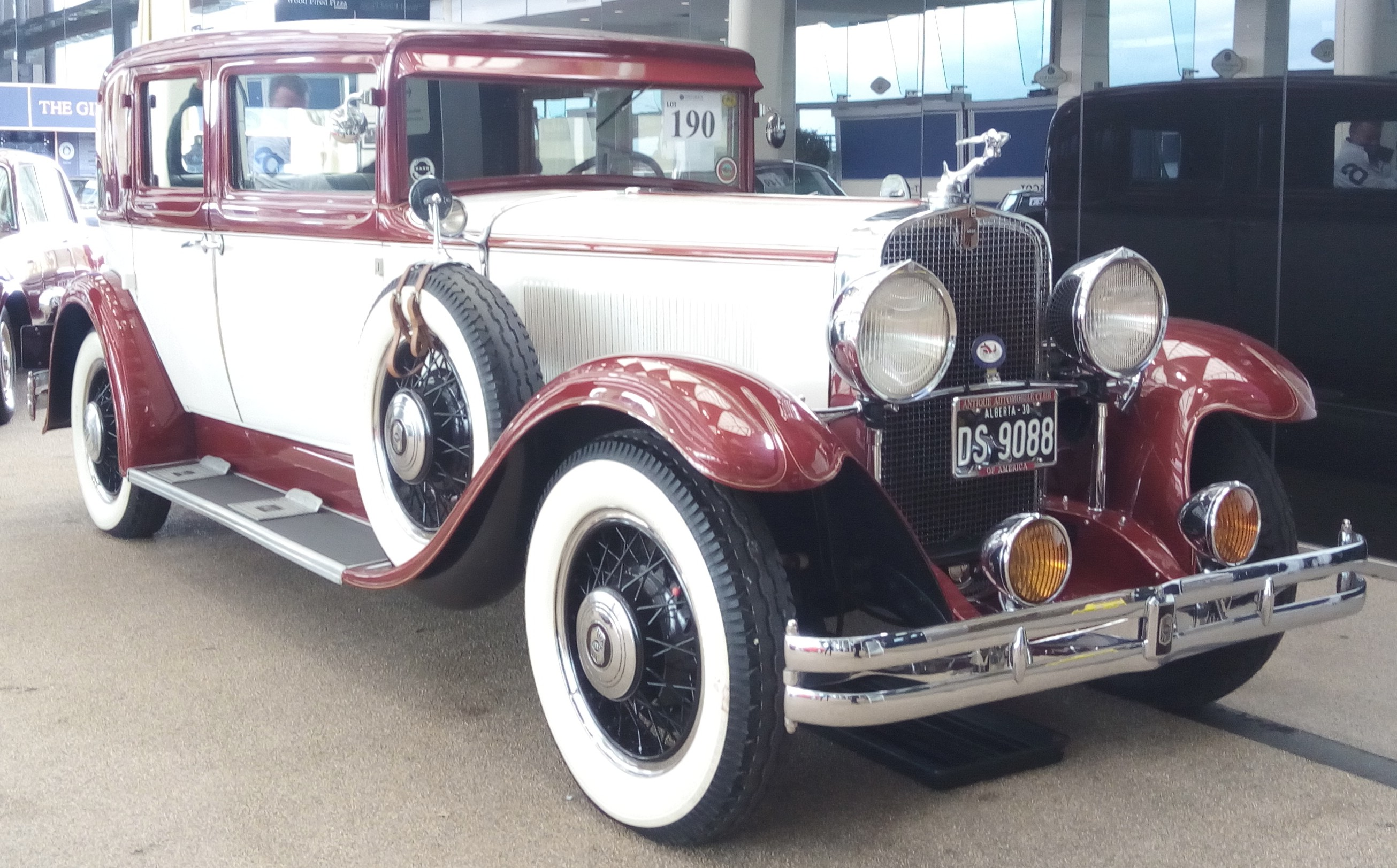
1930 Nash Ambassador Eight sedan

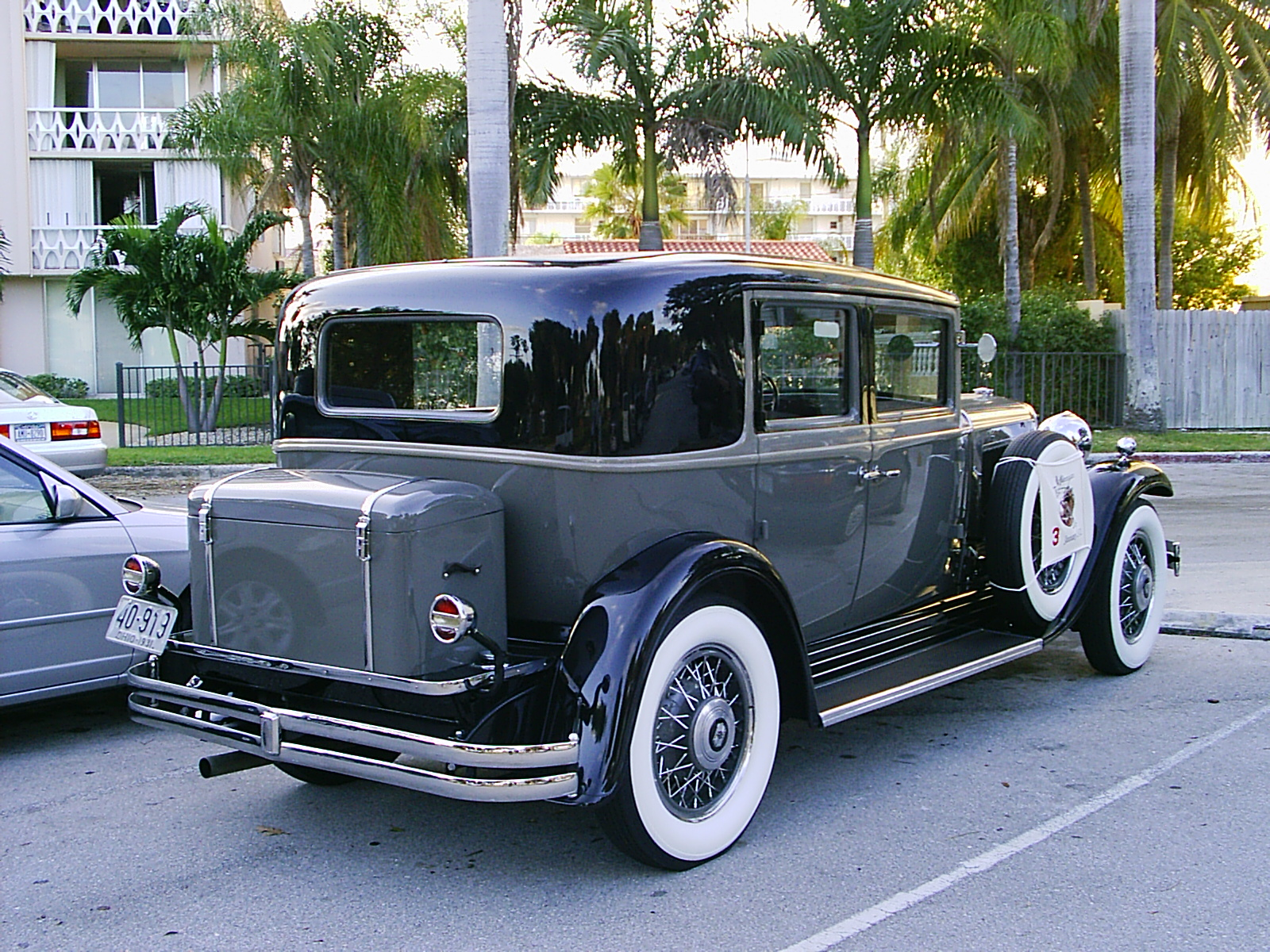
1931 Nash Eight-90 Ambassador sedan

Nash Motors' first use of the name Ambassador was for the 1927 model year, when a specially trimmed four-door, five-passenger club sedan version of the "Nash Advanced Six" (designated model 267) was introduced. The car was unveiled in January at the National Automobile Show in New York. As the most expensive car in the line, the Ambassador received upgrades in upholstery and other trim items for a base price of US$2,090 (FOB) (US$38,737 in 2025 dollars).

The Nash Ambassadors became known for their "lavish equipment and beautiful construction", earning "the nickname 'Kenosha Duesenberg", with the former being a nod to the place of origin and the latter pointing to opulence".

Nash domestic sales for the 1927 model year totaled 109,979. Exports accounted for almost eleven percent of Nash's production in 1927, and several royal families purchased the cars. For example, Prince Wilhelm, Duke of Södermanland of Sweden and Norway, personally visited the Nash factory in Kenosha, Wisconsin, in 1927, and Scandinavian factory workers delivered his Nash Ambassador Six (Model 267) four-door Brougham sedan.

The Ambassador model lost its position as Nash's most expensive car in 1929 with the introduction of a larger seven-passenger sedan and limousine models, which continued to be available through the 1934 model year.

The Ambassador remained in the Advanced Six range until 1930, when the model was moved to the "Nash Twin Ignition Eight" series. In 1931, the more straightforward "Eight-90" designation replaced the cumbersome model name.

Large luxury cars during the 1930s included Packard, Lincoln, Duesenberg, and the Ambassadors made by Nash. The Ambassadors were "luxuriously trimmed, beautifully designed and built bodies, custom-built to individual order, finished off the model that historian David Brownell famously dubbed 'Kenosha's Duesenberg.'"

The Classic Car Club of America (CCCA) recognizes all Nash 1930 Series 480, 490; 1931 Series 880, 890; 1932 Series 980, 990 and Series 1080, 1090. These are "Approved Classics" by nature of them being limited production, high-priced, top end vehicles when new.

Year	Engine	HP	Springs	Brakes	Transmission	Wheelbase	Wheel size
1929	278.4 cu in (4.6 L) OHV I6	78 hp (58 kW; 79 PS)	semi-elliptic	four-wheel mechanical	3-speed manual	130 in (3,302 mm)	20 in (508 mm)

== Mid-1932-1934 ==
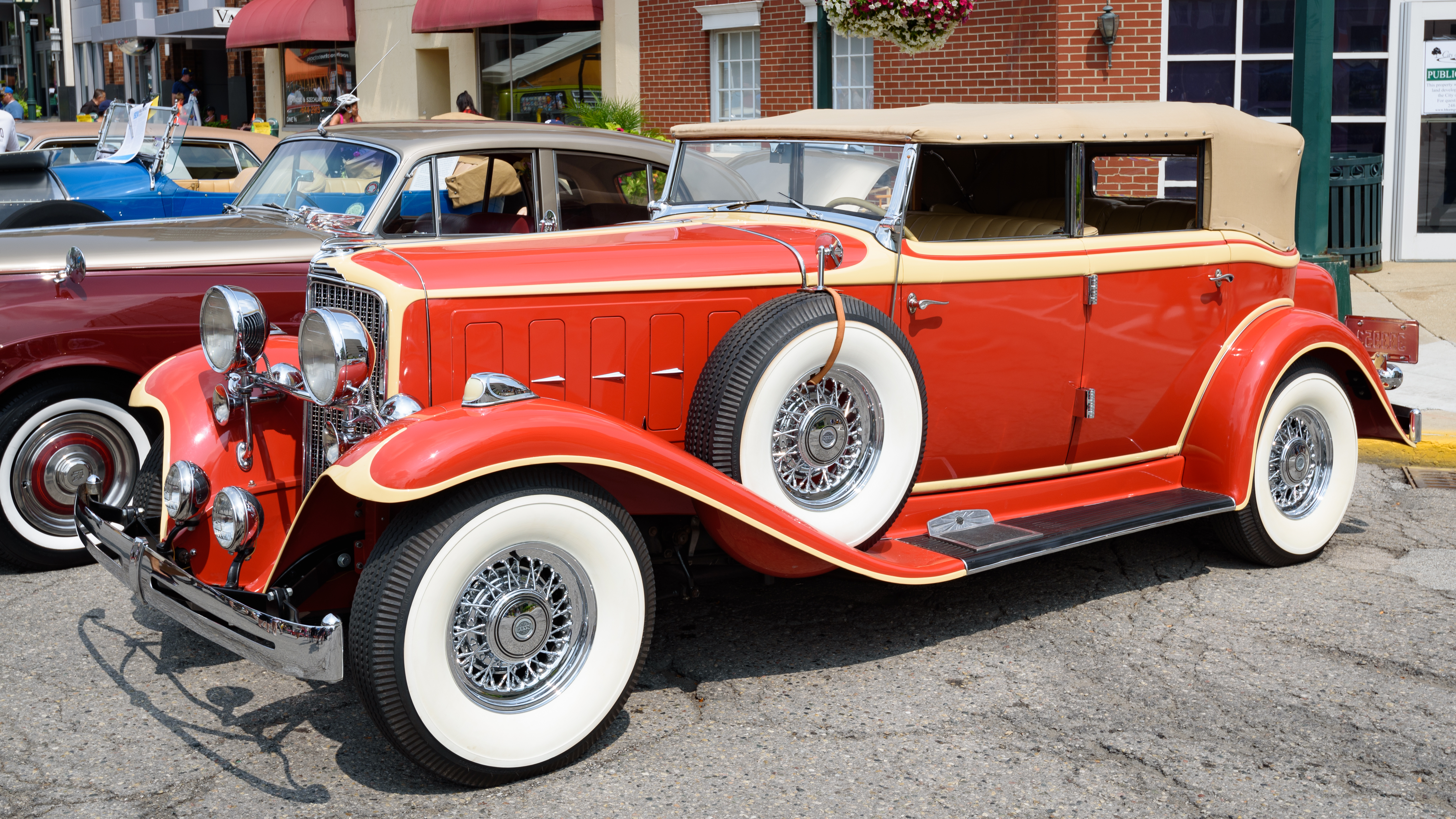
1932 Nash Ambassador 8 Convertible Sedan

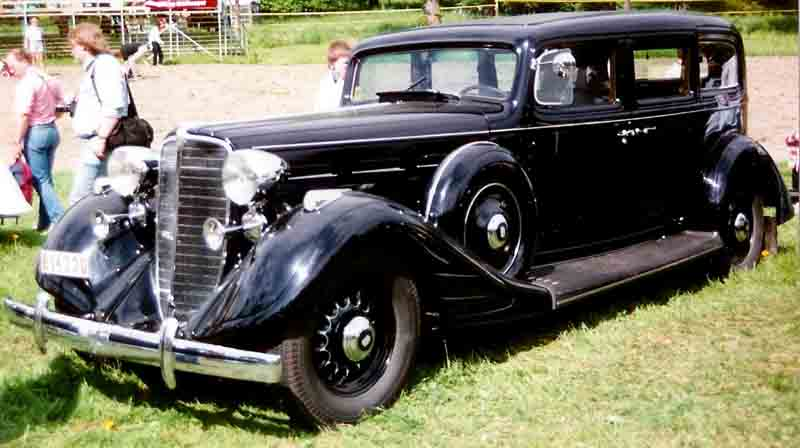
1934 Nash Ambassador

In mid-1932, Nash established the "Ambassador Eight" as a stand-alone model range, offered in several body styles, including coupes and victorias. Riding on 133-inch (3,378 mm) or 142-inch (3,607 mm) wheelbases, the Ambassadors featured a 125 hp (93 kW; 127 PS), 322 cubic inches (5.3 L) straight-eight engine with twin-ignition and overhead valves. All the cars continued to be sumptuously appointed, justifying the title of the "Kenosha Duesenbergs" for their quality, durability, styling, and speed.

This was part of Nash's second 1932 series, which included completely new bodies and engineering updates to all models produced by the company. Sales of all automobiles were dismal during the Great Depression in the United States, yet Nash prospered and was the only company other than General Motors to make a profit in 1932.

The 1933 Nash models remained largely unchanged after the major styling and engineering transformations of early 1932 and were still described as "really a thing of beauty."

For 1934, Nash introduced a new styling theme called "Speedstream" that featured use of ornamental moldings in body panels and fenders in a streamlined and Art Deco way. Russian Count Alexis de Sakhnoffsky influenced the designs, and the new bodies featured streamline accents, bullet-shaped headlights, horizontal hood ribs, rear-wheel spats, and built-in luggage boots with a full beaver-tail rear end. The Ambassador Eight series for this year was limited to various four-door sedan body styles.

The Nash Ambassador 8 now saw new competition with the redesigned and lower-priced LaSalle, Auburn V-12, REO-Royale 8, Buick Series 34-90, and the Chrysler Imperial Airflow.

The CCCA has recognized all 1932 Series Advanced 8 and Ambassador 8, as well as the 1933 and 1934 Nash Ambassador 8, as "Approved Classics."

== 1935–1942 ==
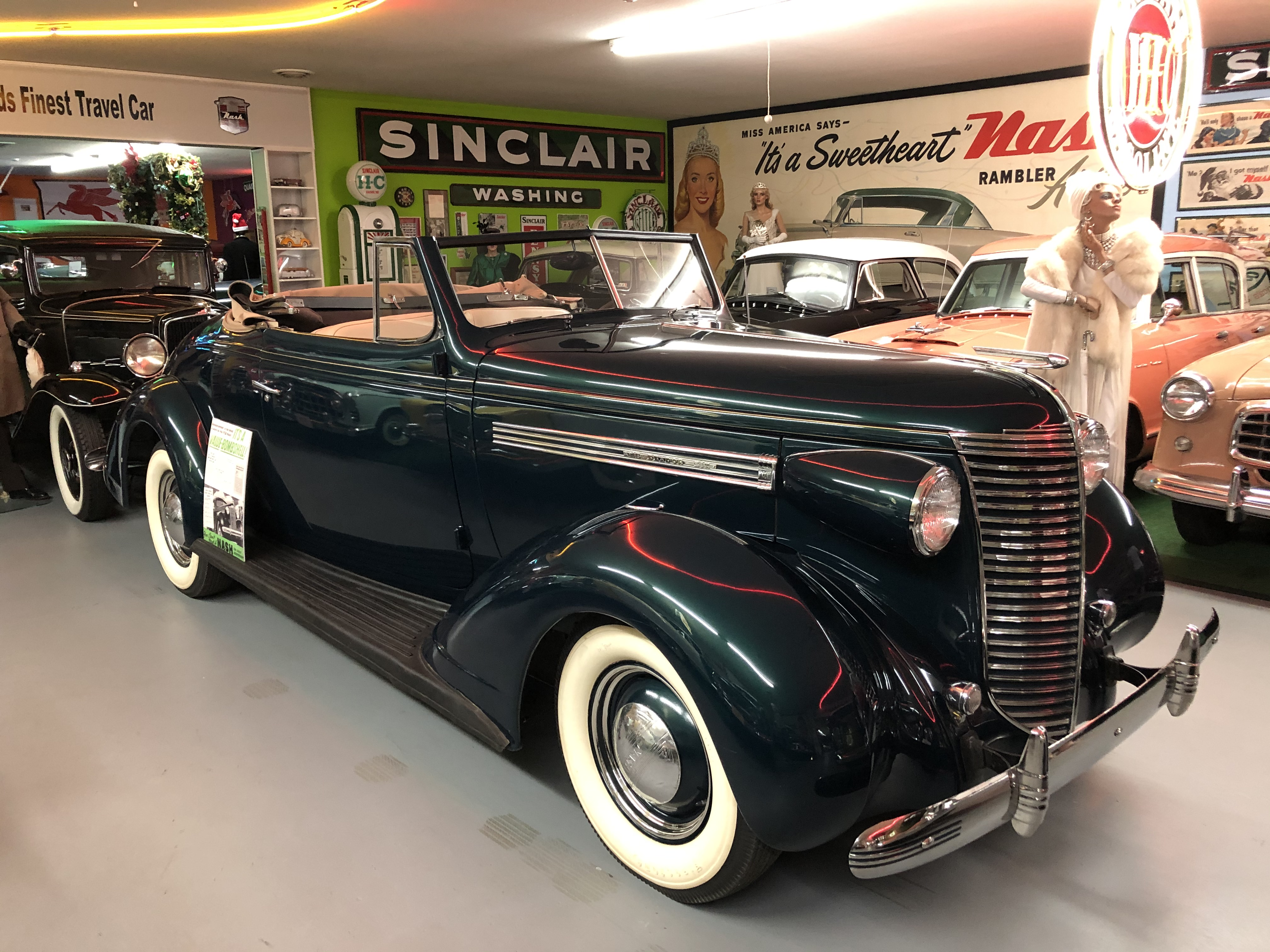
1938 Nash Ambassador Six Cabriolet

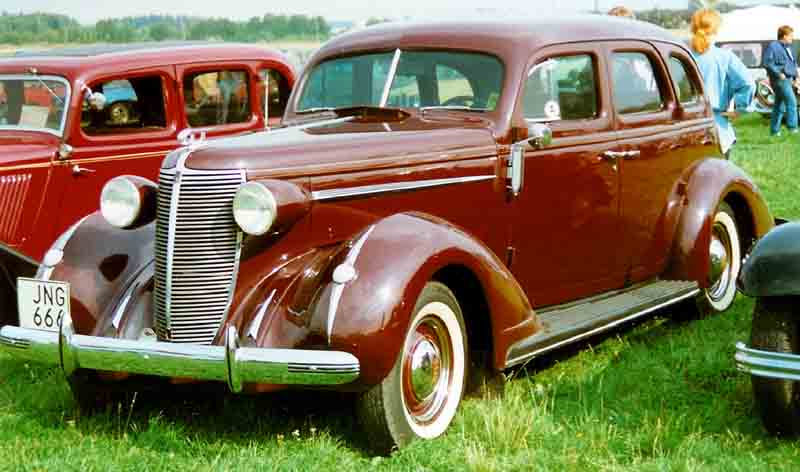
1937 Nash Ambassador Six sedan

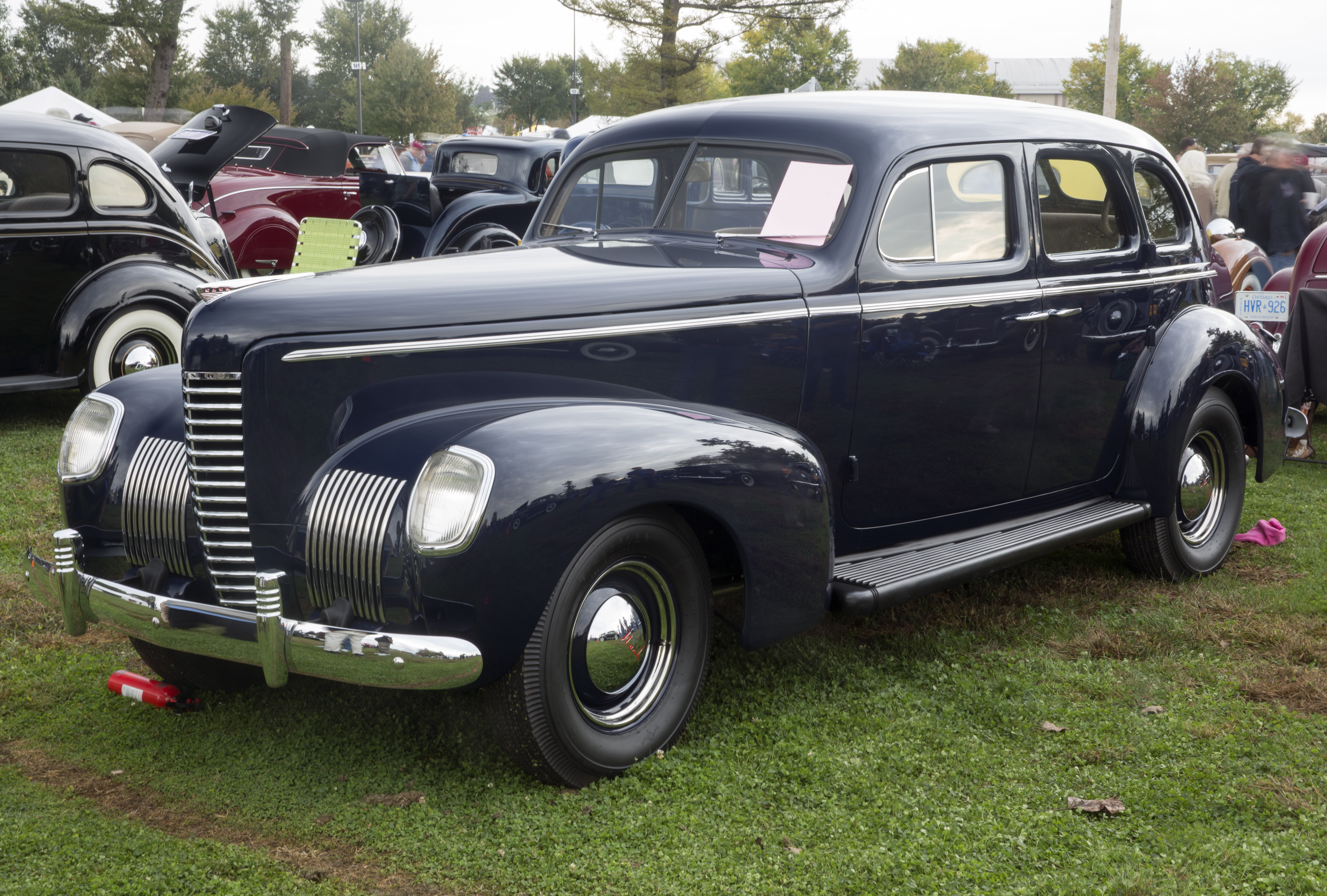
1939 Nash Ambassador Eight sedan

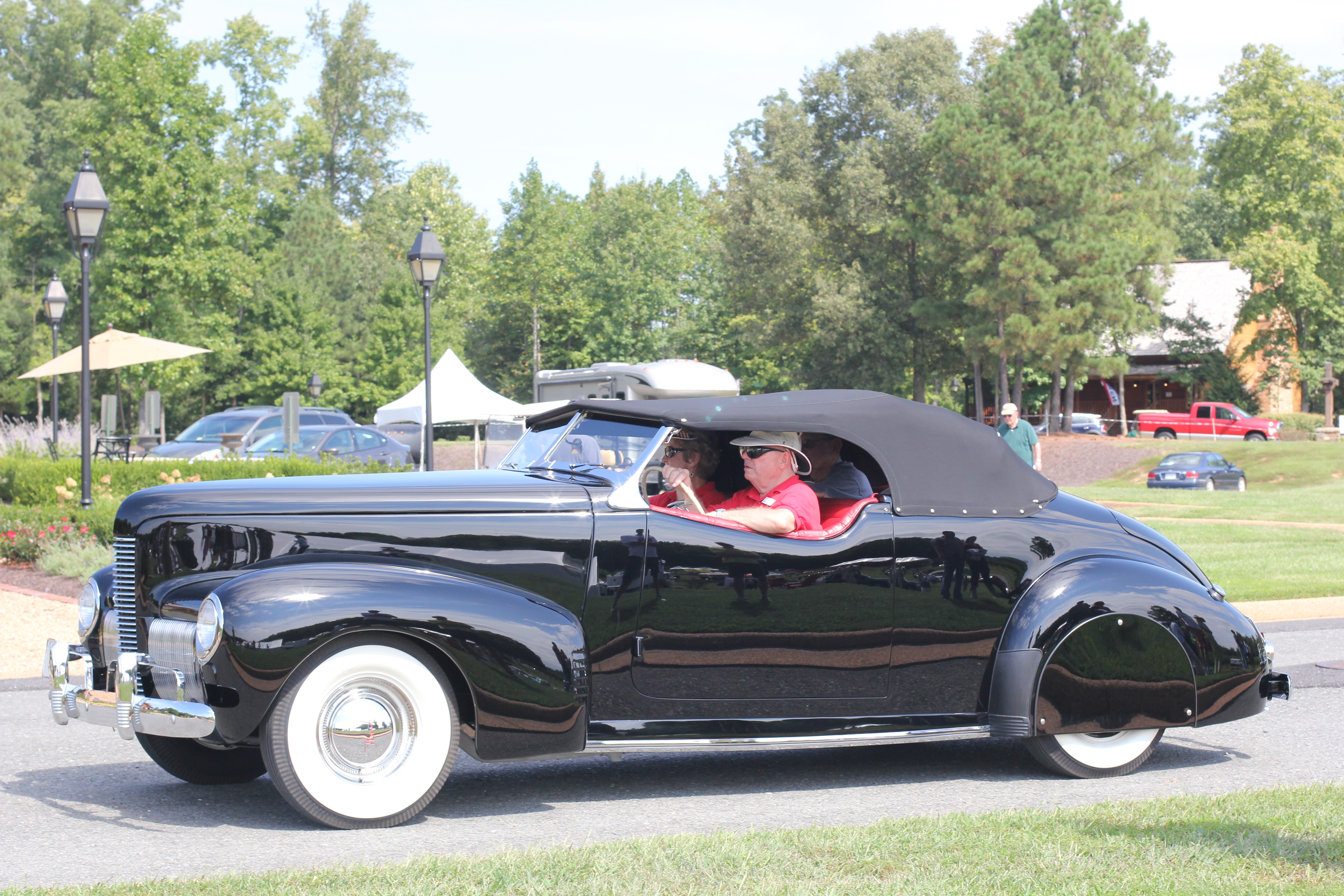
1940 Sakhnoffsky Special Cabriolet

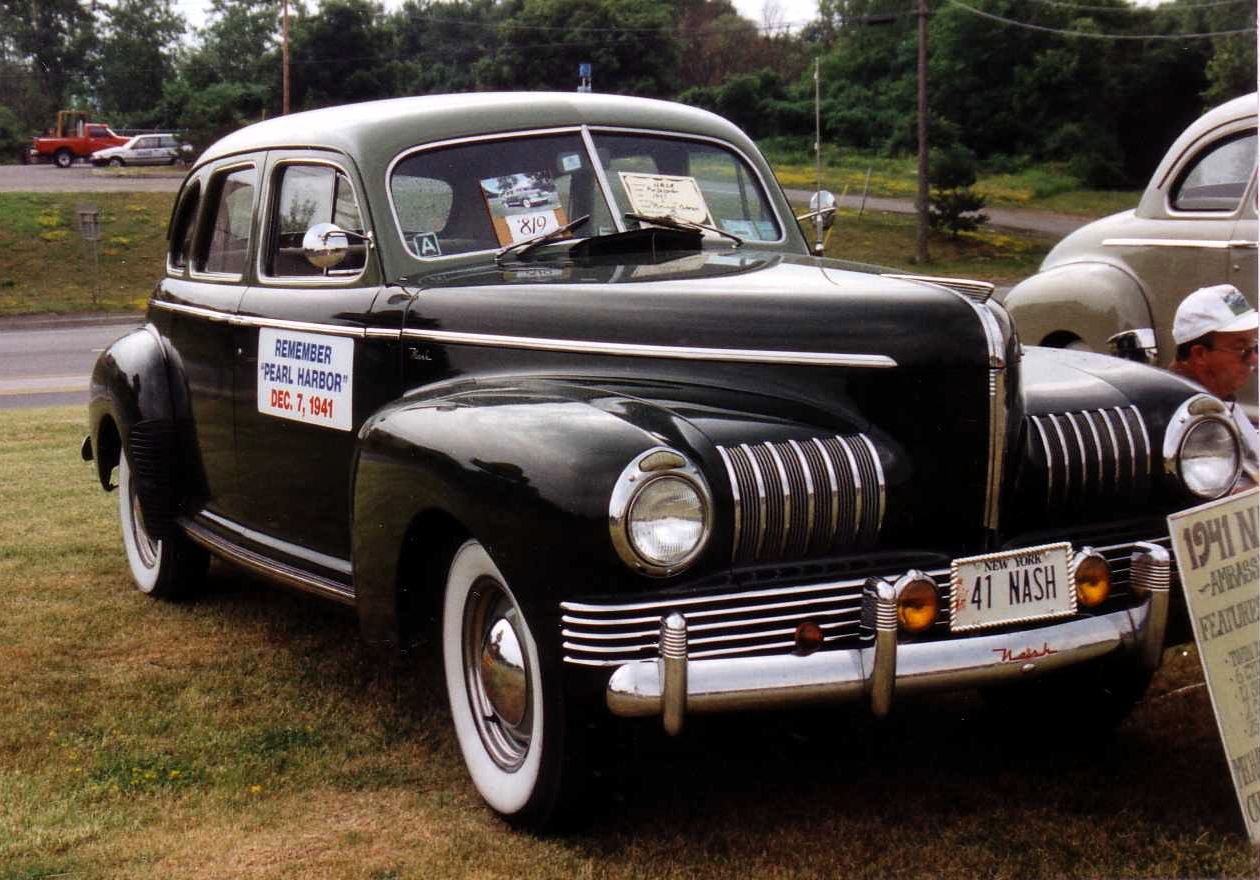
1941 Nash Ambassador sedan

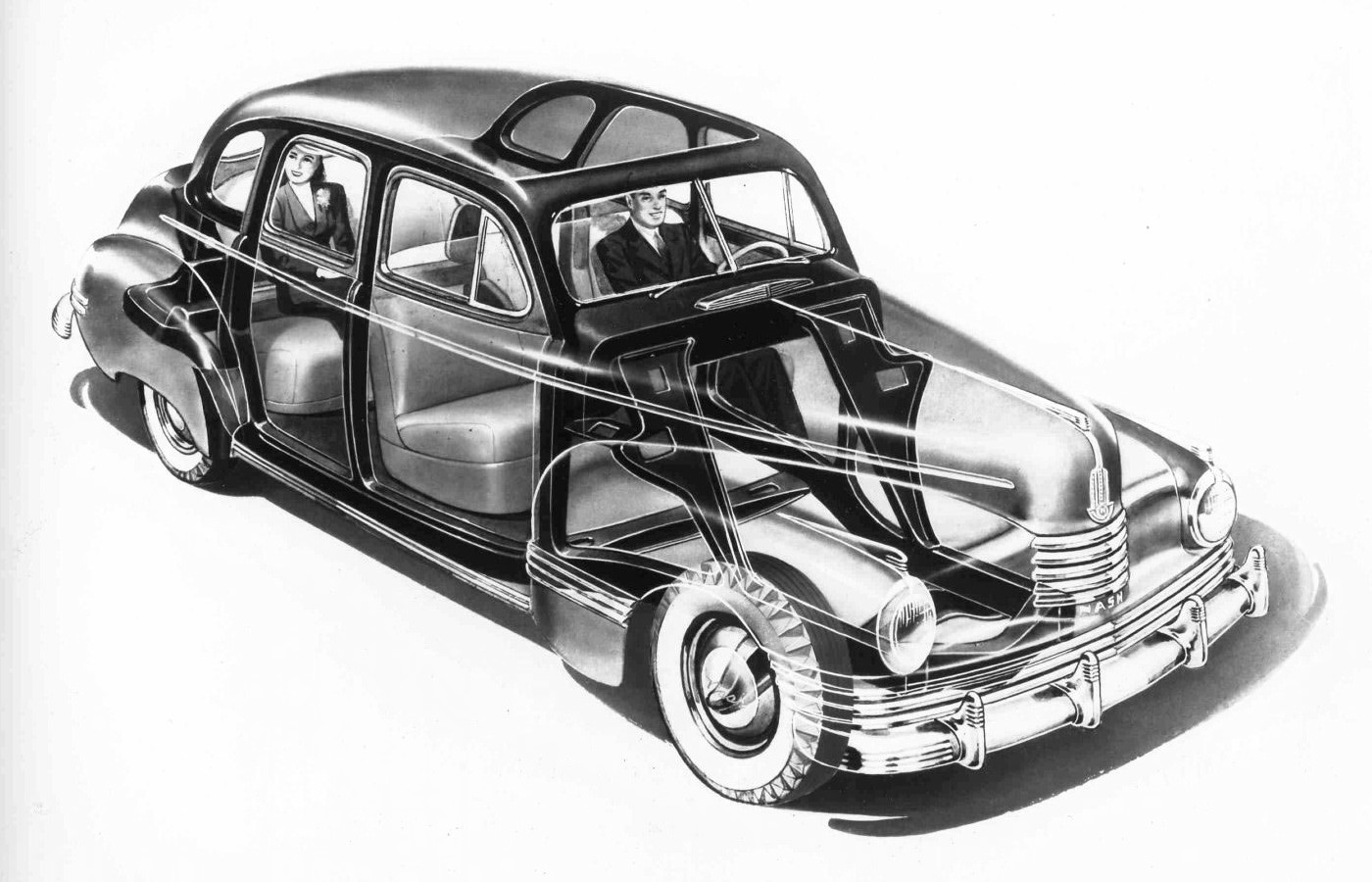
Line drawing of 1942 Nash Ambassador 600 sedan

The 1935 model year featured complete re-styling, described as "Aeroform", with a further trimming of body styles. A new two-door sedan was added to the Ambassador Eight series. However, the 1935 Ambassador Eight was now built on a shorter 125-inch (3,175 mm) wheelbase and used the smaller, former Advanced Eight engine. Nash discontinued manufacturing and marketing the big models of the 1930 through 1934 era.

While the Ambassador had been offered only with Nash's in-line eight from mid-1932 through 1935, the 1936 Ambassador Six added Nash's largest, 234.8 cu in (3.8 L) in-line six as well, in a 121-inch (3,073 mm) wheelbase model, formerly known as the Advanced Six. In 1937, Nash acquired the Kelvinator Corporation as part of a deal that allowed Charlie Nash's handpicked successor, George W. Mason, to become President of the new Nash-Kelvinator Corporation.

The 1937 models saw the return of coupes and convertibles to the Ambassador lines. From 1936 onward, the senior Nash models used identical bodies, relying on a longer wheelbase as well as the hood and front fenders (plus subtle trim augmentations) to provide visual cues to differentiate the more expensive Eights from the less expensive Six models.

Beginning in 1937, even the low-priced LaFayette series came under this plan. This basic formula was used through the final AMC Ambassador in 1974, except between 1962 and 1964, when the Rambler Ambassador and the Rambler Classic shared the same wheelbase and front sheet metal.

As a marketing innovation, the Sinclair Oil Corporation teamed up with Babe Ruth for a baseball contest where a 1937 Nash Ambassador Eight sedan was awarded every week.

A custom-designed and -built convertible model was marketed for 1940, the Sakhnoffsky Special Cabriolet. The CCA recognizes this Special Cabriolet as an "Approved Classic".

For the 1941 and 1942 model years, all Nash vehicles became Ambassadors and were built in long and short wheelbases. The Ambassador Eight now shared the Ambassador Six's 121 inches (3,073 mm). The Nash Ambassador 600, built on a 112-inch (2,845 mm) wheelbase, became the first popular domestic automobile to be built using the single-welded "unibody" type of monocoque construction that Nash called "Unitized", rather than body-on-frame. From 1941 through 1948, Nash Ambassador models placed this unibody structure on top of a conventional frame, thus creating a solid and sturdy automobile. It was also one of the first cars in the "low-priced" market segment with coil spring suspension in front and back, giving it "the Arrow-Flight ride" along with other benefits.

With wartime conservation, the 1942 Ambassador Six and Eight were not available with the twin ignition system. All reverted to a single spark plug per cylinder. The 1941 and 1942 Ambassador 600 was also the only Ambassador powered by an L-head engine. Nash would remain with this model arrangement through the post-war 1946 through 1948 model years, although the 600 would no longer be known as an Ambassador.

Civilian car and truck production was curtailed during World War II (1942–1945), and companies turned to production that became part of the "arsenal of democracy."

== 1946–1948 ==
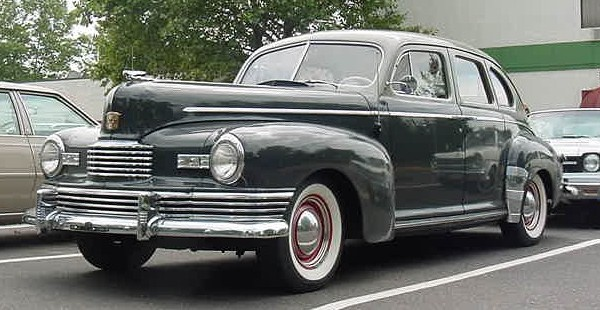
1946 Nash Ambassador Slipstream 4-door sedan

=== 1946 ===
Following World War II, Nash-Kelvinator restarted car production on 27 October 1945. Consumer demand for new cars was high, as the existing vehicles on the road were old and poorly maintained due to wartime restrictions on parts and a shortage of skilled mechanics.

Like automakers at the time, Nash revived its pre-war vehicle models. Minimal changes to new cars reflected the automotive industry's broader challenges that included ongoing material shortages, difficulties with retooling factories, and significant labor issues. The focus was on getting cars to market quickly to meet consumer needs, rather than introducing brand new models and designs which finally arrived in 1949.

The 1946 Nash Ambassador models were slightly facelifted versions of the pre-war 1941 version. They featured a new grille and minor trim changes but retained the same body, chassis, and drivetrain as their predecessors. The Ambassador Eights were no longer part of the lineup. For the 1946 model year, the Ambassador Six became the top-tier offering in the Nash line. It carried over the full-size design with traditional body-on-frame on a 121-inch (3,073 mm) wheelbase, powered by a 234.8 cu in (3.8 L), 112 hp (84 kW; 114 PS) overhead-valve I6 engine. This engine featured advanced elements, including aluminum alloy pistons, automatic spark control, and a balanced crankshaft with a vibration dampener. The standard transmission was a three-speed manual with an optional overdrive, branded by Nash as "Cruising Gear".

==== Ambassador Suburban ====
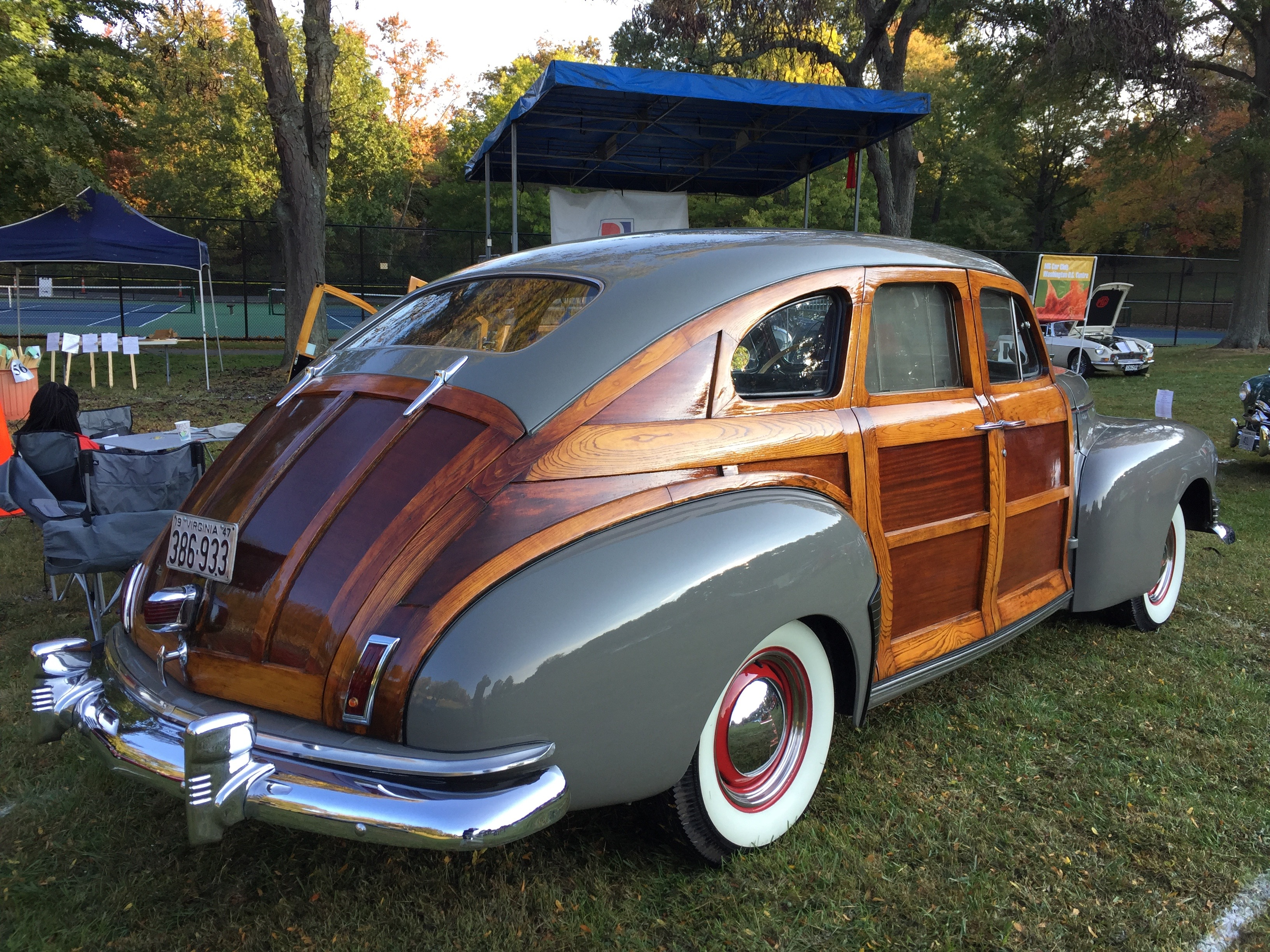
1946 Nash Ambassador Suburban

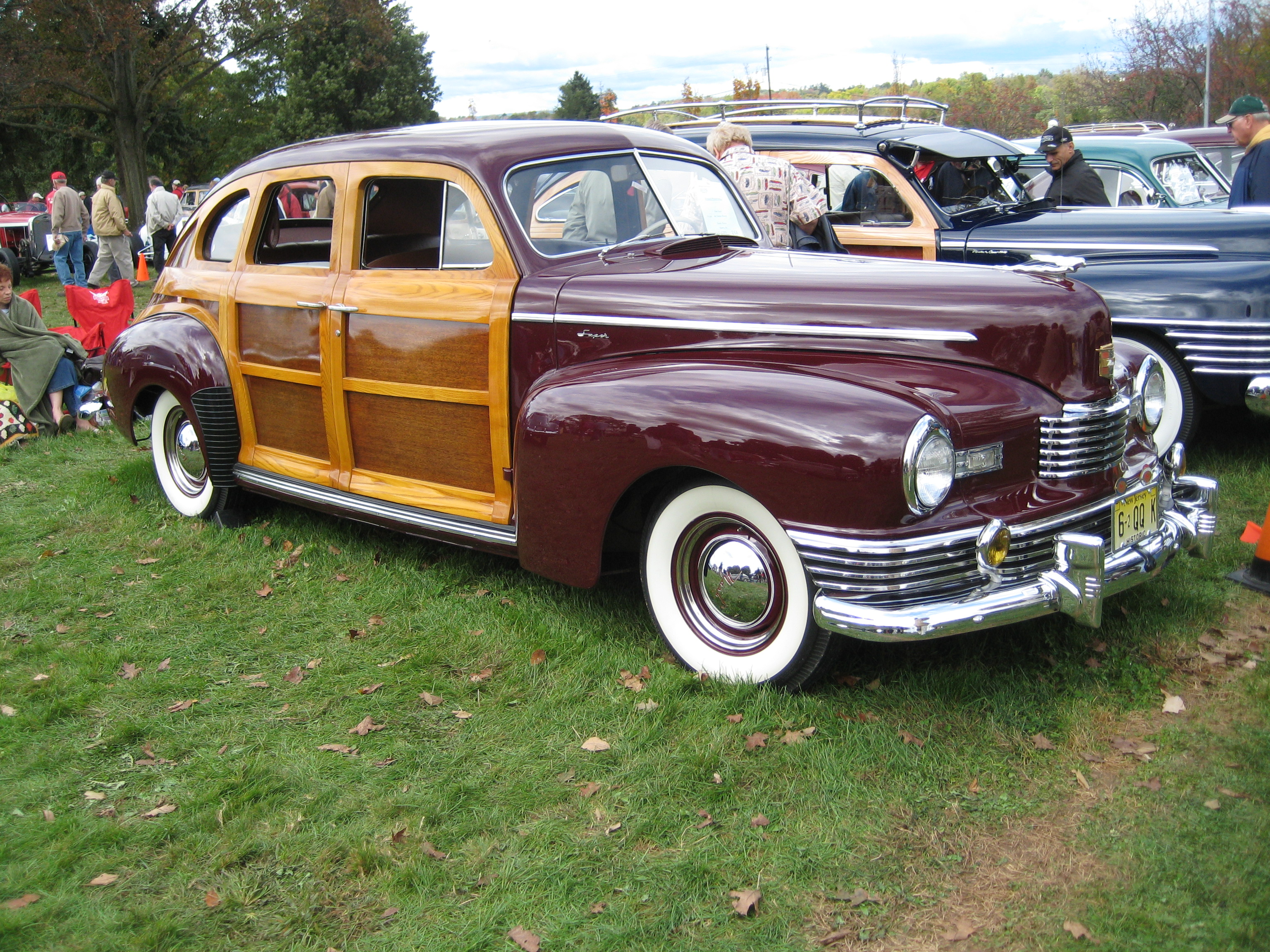
Nash Ambassador Suburban

A special model for 1946 was the Ambassador "Suburban", a distinctive, partial wood-bodied variant designed as a halo car to draw customers into showrooms. The Suburban's coachwork was based on the "Slipstream" sedan characterized by its 1940s streamlined design.

The Nash Ambassador "Suburban" was a sedan/wagon hybrid, and distinct from a traditional station wagon design with an elongated roof and tailgate. The Suburban's construction was also a hybrid, primarily utilizing steel. It featured a one-piece metal roof stamping and steel inner doors, which were concealed behind the exterior panels crafted from hardwood. The ash framing and window surrounds were complemented by Honduras mahogany paneling, the woodwork supplied by Mitchell-Bentley of Owosso, Michigan. The company also supplied the components for the distinctive Chrysler Town & Country models as well as the wood-paneled 1946 Ford and Mercury Sportsman convertibles. Like other Nash models, the Suburban offered pioneering options that enhanced comfort and convenience. These included the "Cruising Gear" overdrive, the trend-setting "Weather Eye" heating and ventilation system that drew fresh air from outside the car, and a remote-control Zenith radio, which allowed the driver to change stations with their toe via a button on the floor. Production of the Ambassador Suburban was limited, with Nash building 1,000 examples between 1946 and 1948. Of these, 275 were produced in 1946.

1946 Ambassador	Production
4-door Trunk Sedan	3,875
4-door Slipstream	26,925
2-door Brougham	4,825
4-door Suburban	275
Total	35,900

=== 1947 ===
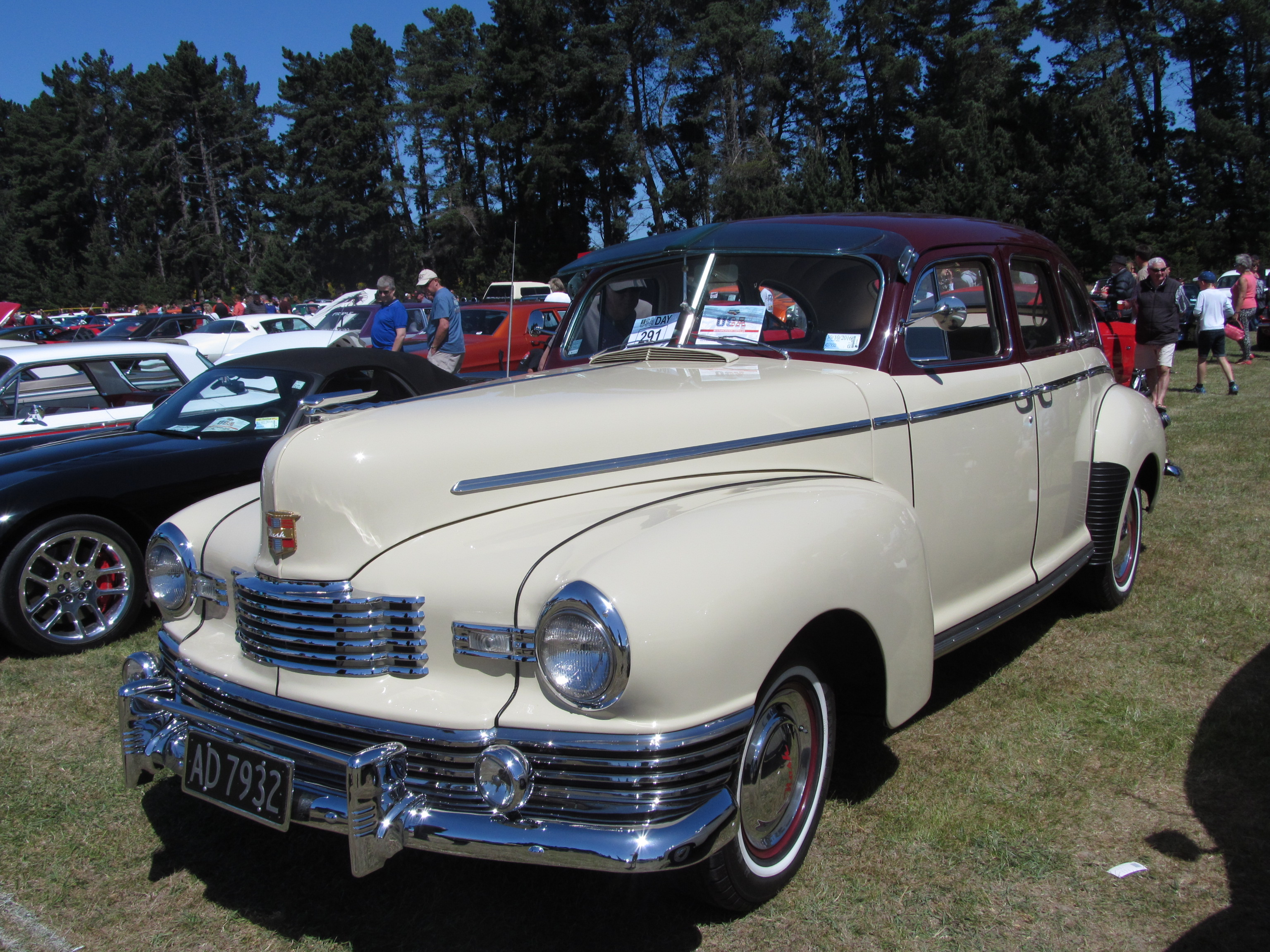
1947 Nash Ambassador Slipstream sedan

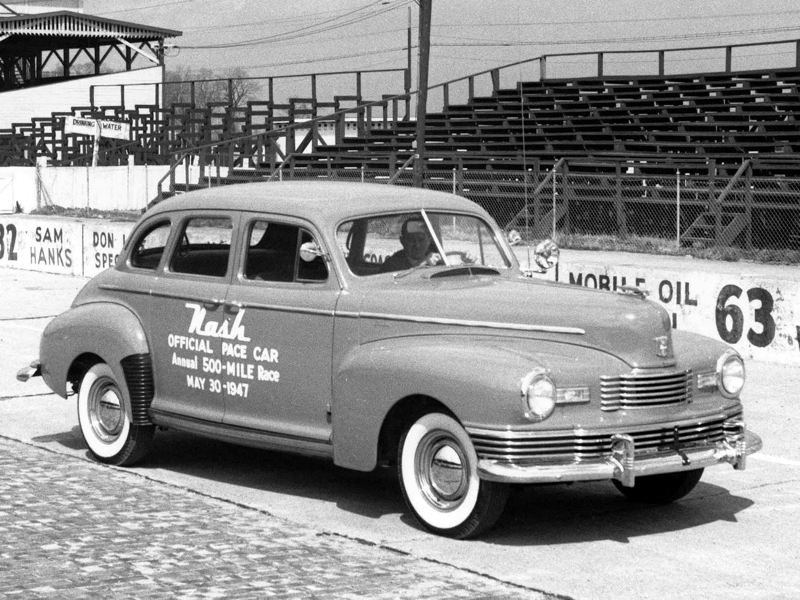
PR photograph of Indianapolis Pace car

The 1947 Nash Ambassador models were essentially unchanged from their 1946 counterparts. The upper grille's six horizontal bars were extended partway to the parking lamps. One trim level was offered across the body styles. Marketing highlighted the advanced engineering features with the "You'll be Ahead in a Nash" tagline.

Nash marketing demonstrated the Ambassador's performance and economy through several events.

- Erwin George "Cannonball" Baker drove a 1947 Nash Ambassador a total of 7,492.8 miles (12,058 km) miles from Indianapolis, Indiana, to Portland, Oregon, and back. During this cross-country run, the Ambassador achieved 27.1 mpg_{‑US} (8.7 L/100 km; 32.5 mpg_{‑imp}). Baker reported remarkably low operating expenses of $58.17 for gasoline, 3 quarts of oil, and $0.75 for a tire puncture repair, resulting in a cost of approximately $0.0077 per mile.
- A highlight for 1947 was the selection of the Ambassador as the official pace car of the Indianapolis 500 race. This was Nash's only time to pace the event. The car was driven by George W. Mason, the CEO of the automaker. There were several publicity cars, but the pace car was finished in a non-factory canary yellow and was the first time a four-door closed car served as pace car. In 1940, a Studebaker Champion two-door coupe paced the race. The Ambassador sedan also remains one the few non-convertible pace cars honored at the Indianapolis race.
- On 20 September, "Cannonball" Baker drove a company-backed 1947 Nash Ambassador up the Mount Washington Auto Road in New Hampshire. Baker set a new stock closed-car record from base to summit, completing the 99 hairpin turns in 15 minutes, 27.66 seconds, running entirely in second gear. Baker beat the record he set in 1928 driving an Essex.
- On 22 October, "Cannonball" Baker set a record run up the 6,684 feet (2,037 m) Mount Mitchell in North Carolina. He covered the 20 miles (32 km) single-lane mountain trail composed of dirt, clay and loose gravel with 638 hairpin turns in 38 minutes, 31.6 seconds for an average speed of 31.25 mph (50 km/h).

1947 Ambassador	Production
4-door Trunk Sedan	15,927
4-door Slipstream	14,505
2-door Brougham	8,673
4-door Suburban	595
Total	39,700

=== 1948 ===
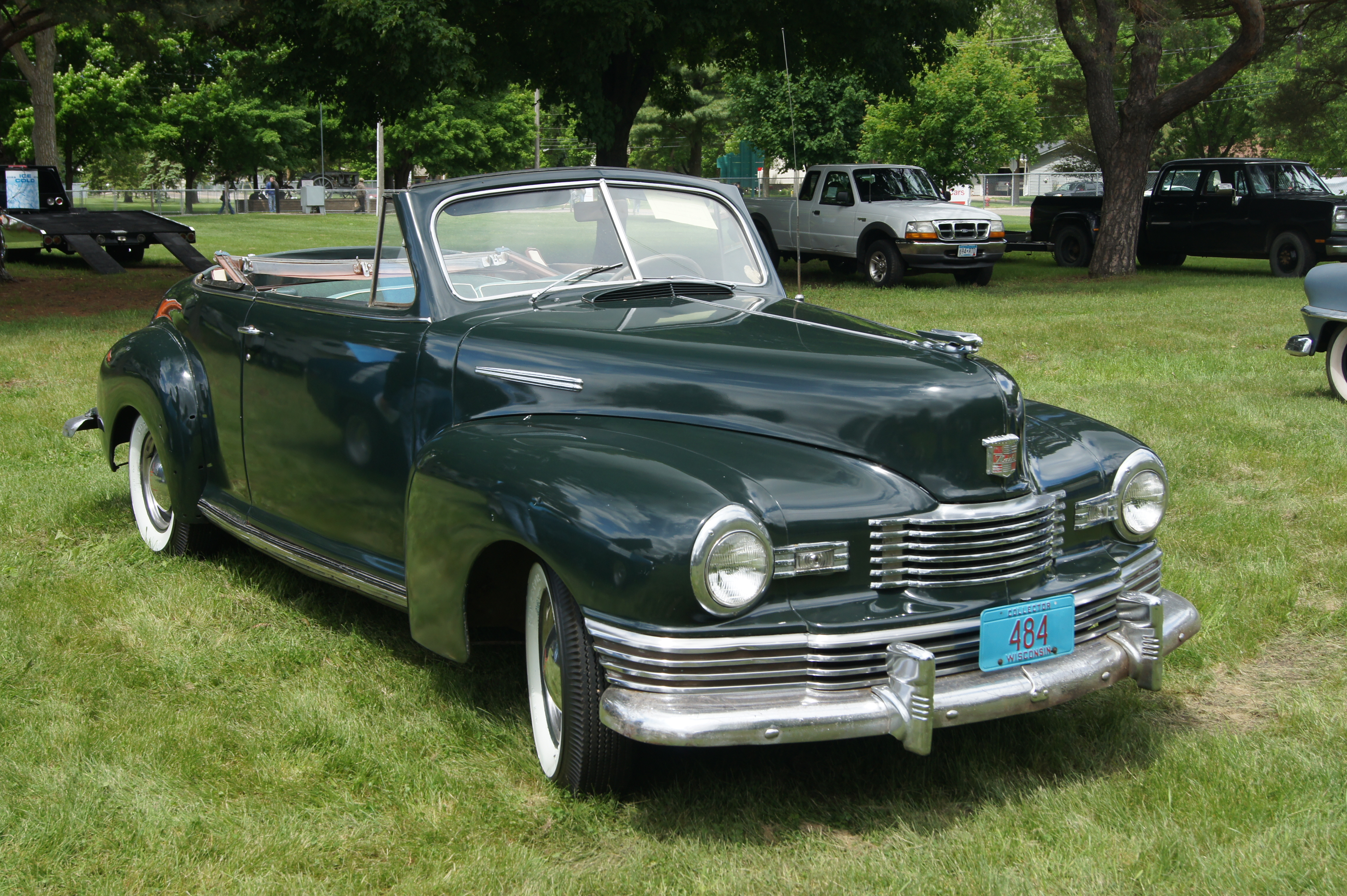
1948 Nash Ambassador Convertible

For the 1948 model year, Nash introduced a new convertible body style to the Ambassador range. Nash produced 1,000 examples of this one-year-only convertible. As a halo model, Nash reportedly allocated only one convertible to its major dealerships. Production for all Ambassador models in 1948 increased to approximately 50,000 cars.

The completely new unibody "Airflyte" design for the 1949 model year did not include a convertible. The open-body style returned in smaller forms as the landau design of the 1950 Nash Rambler and the imported 1951 luxury sports car or grand tourer Nash-Healey.

The 1948 Ambassador custom convertible was the first car to ever bear the name Twin H Power on its engine conversion. While the "Twin H-Power" name is mostly associated with the famous dual-carburetor engine option for the racing1950s Hudson Hornet, However the Nash Ambassador was actually the first car to use this name when a special twin carburetor conversion was fitted by the Nash factory on 4 very special Nash Ambassador Convertibles in 1948. These four cars were specifically modified for advertising the new Ambassador convertible and were loaned to board members of the newly formed NASCAR to use during the 1948 season, The cars were a big attraction at the first NASCAR Race at Daytona Beach in Florida, the perfect place to show of the new convertible. All 4 cars were painted in Lagoon Blue and had hotted up high compression engines and twin carburetors fitted by the factory, This conversion was named by Nash “Twin H Power” and recorded in a letter written my Nash director George W Mason to one of the NASCAR board members dated 6th December 1947. Nash were one of the first major manufacturers to sign up for the newly formed NASCAR and had been the official pace car at the Idy 500 the previous year. They had seen the advertising power of racing and wanted to ride on the back of that performance. The Canary yellow and black Ambassador Saloon that was used for the 1947 Indianapolis pace car was the first car to be converted to Twin H Power in December 1947 for Cannonball Baker to use on several occasions during 1948 to promote the brand in driving tests around America. That specific car was not labelled with the Twin H Power advertising etc but instead displayed as “Standard” it seems they forgot to mention the other carburetor and upped compression ratio etc. After 1948 all the cars were taken back to Nash and most probably converted to standard before being re-sold. There is unfortunately no record of which chassis numbers these four cars were, nor the Indy Pace car. It seems that the “Twin H Power” name was not seen again until 1951 when Hudson used it for their high-performance "dual-carburetor" setup used on the now famous Hudson Hornets for NASCAR. Apparently, this use of the name was notified to the board at Nash and started some back-and-forth discussions. But some good came from it as these discussions and a realization of shared interests led to the idea of Nash and Hudson joining forces and eventually to the 1954 merger to form AMC.

== 1949–1951 ==
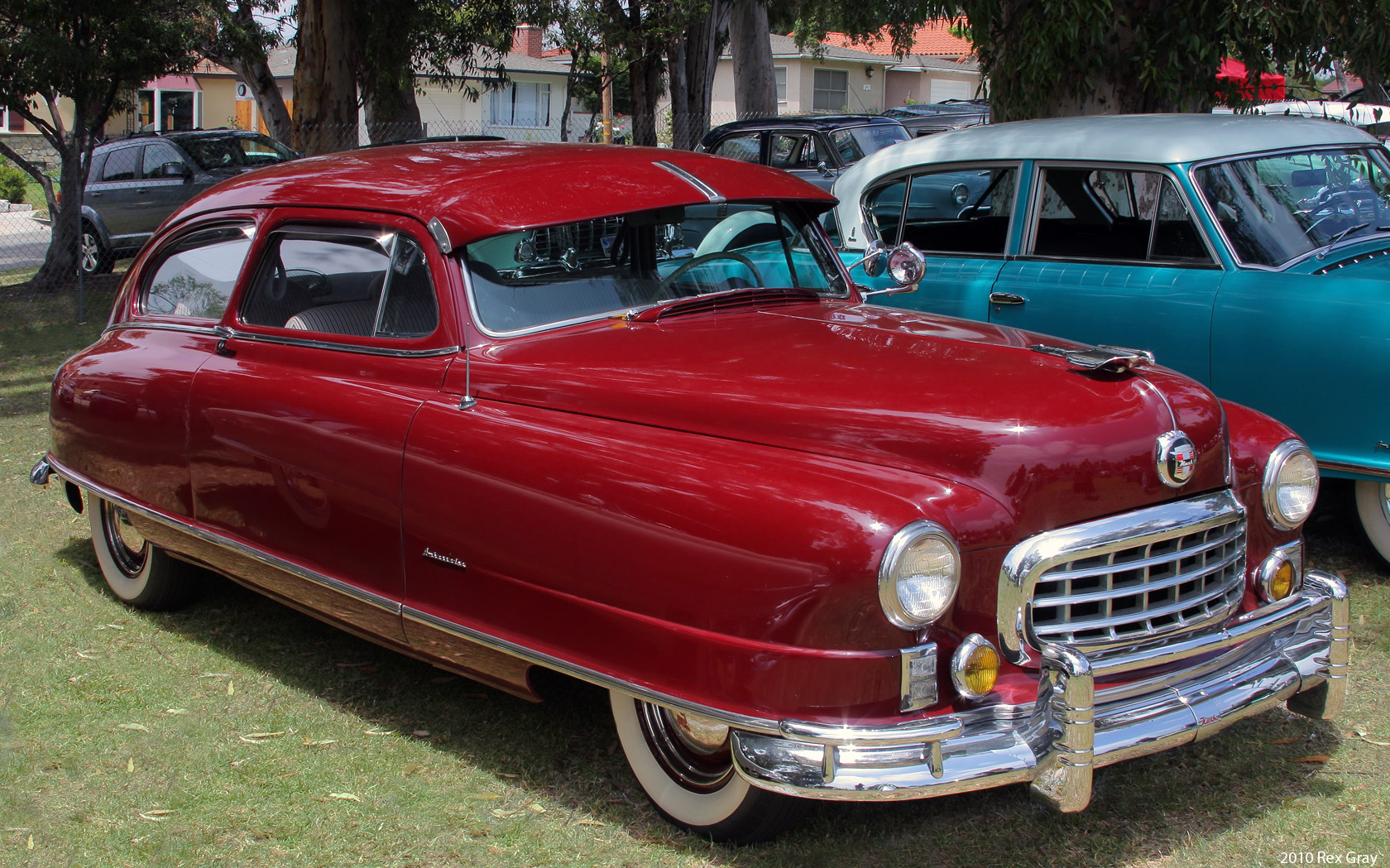
1949 Nash Ambassador 2-door sedan

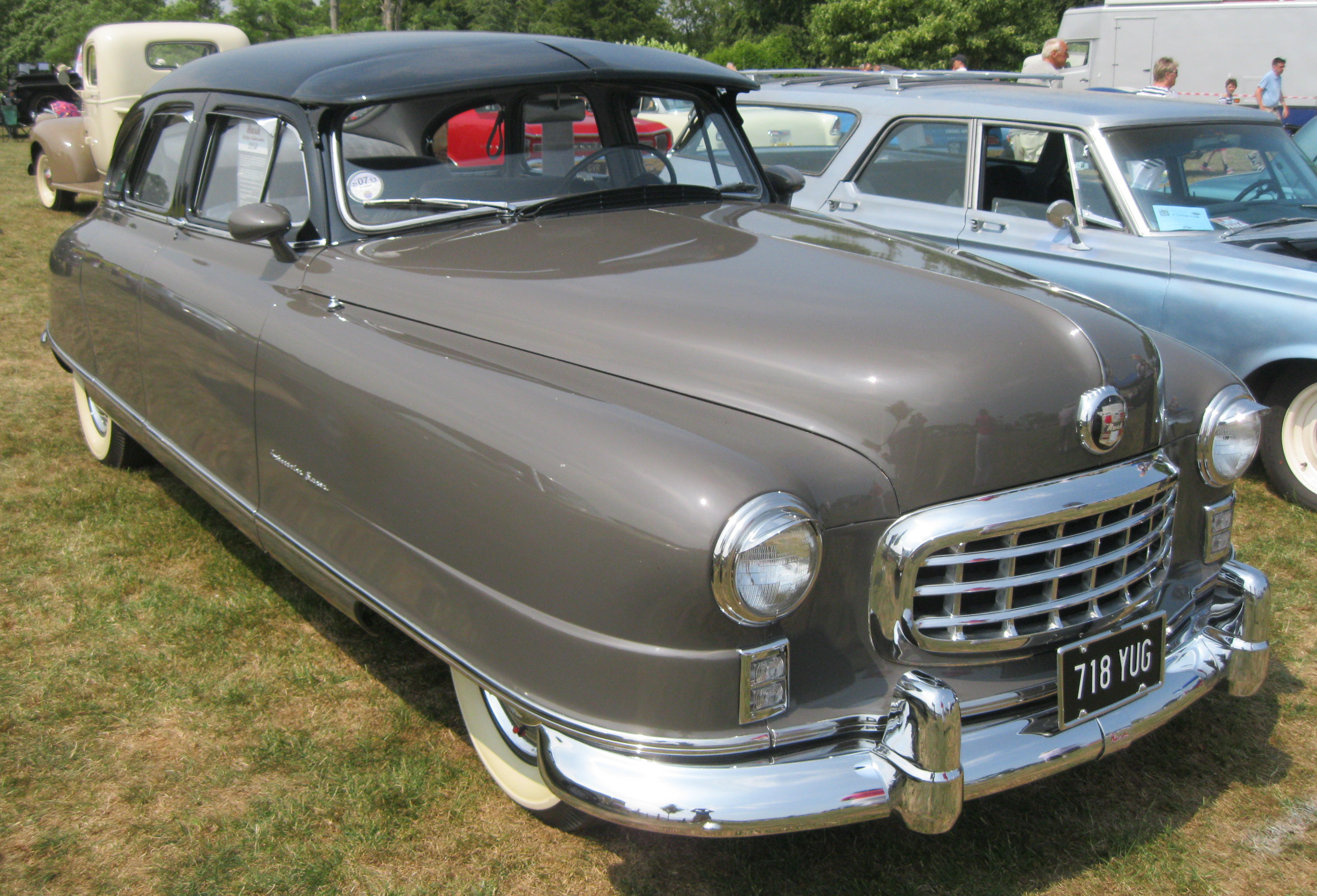
1950 Nash Ambassador

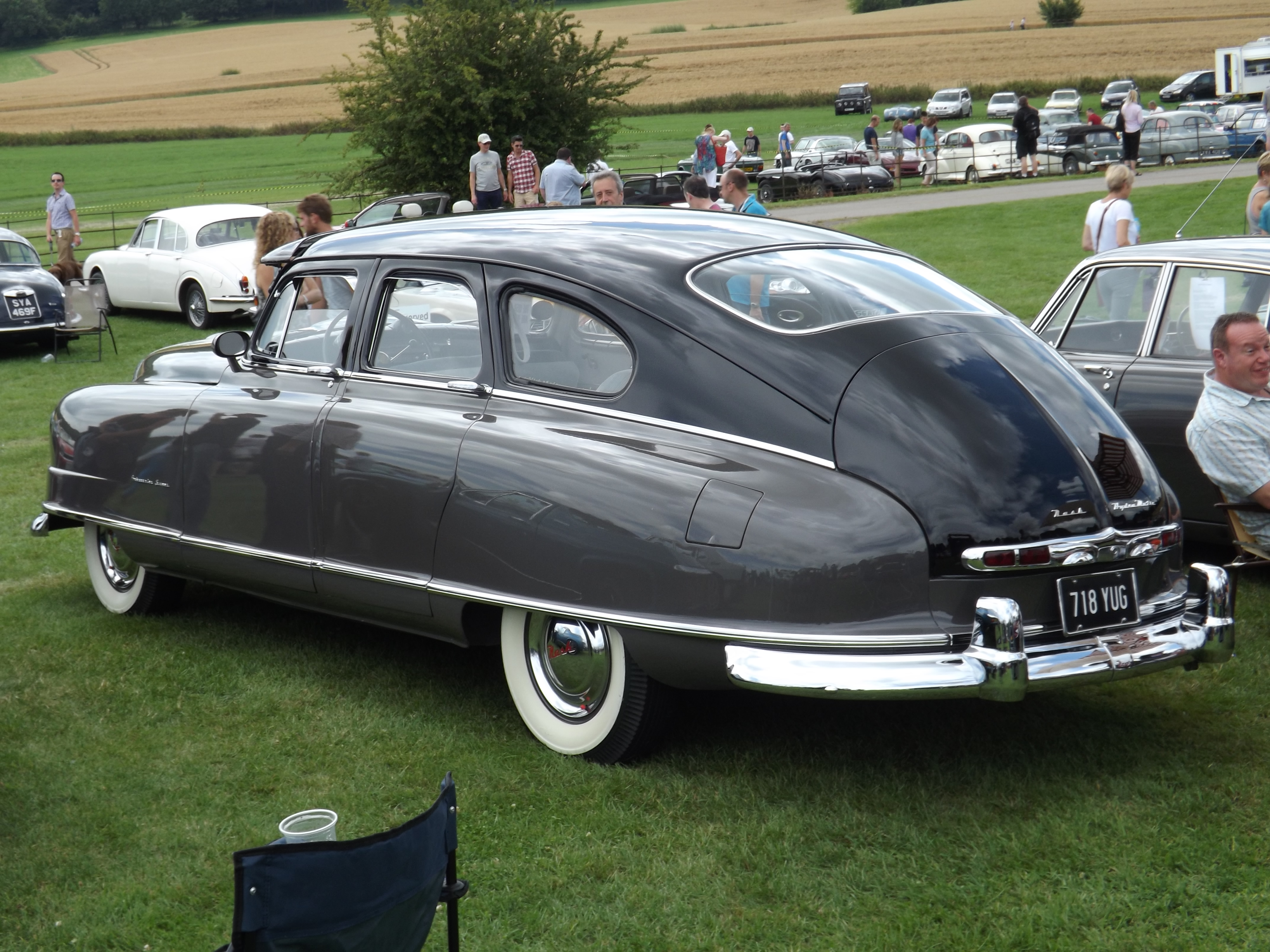
1950 Nash Ambassador

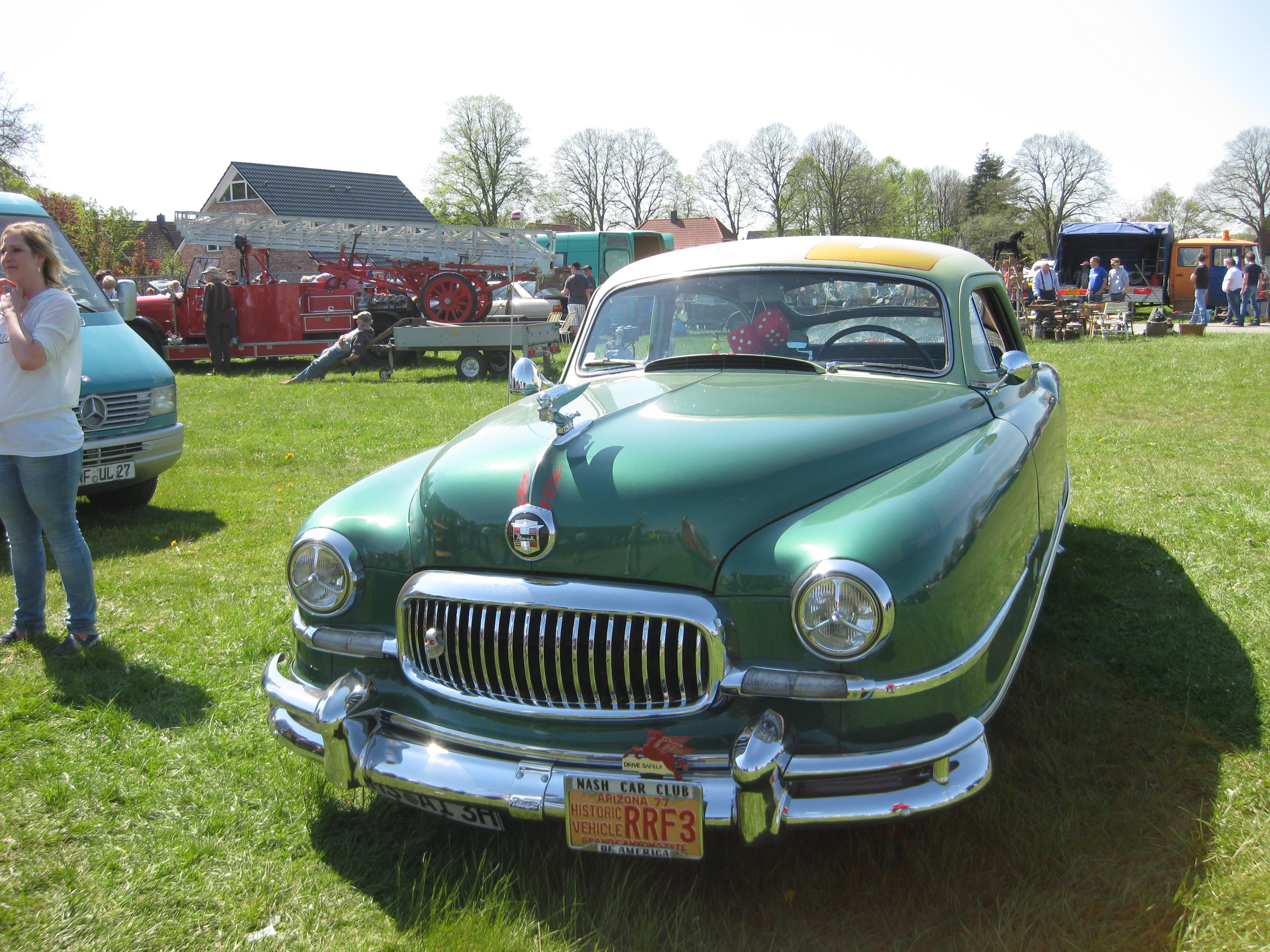
1951 Nash Ambassador 2-door sedan

Nash-Kelvinator president George Mason believed in fiscal responsibility, but also wanted to be "a bit daring, bold, and out of the mainstream" by making "cars noticeably different from those of the mainline Big Three producers." Nash's Vice President of Engineering, Nils Eric Wahlberg, had access to a wind tunnel during the war and believed that future cars should take advantage of aerodynamics to achieve many benefits. The company used revenue from its wartime contracts to develop a car that was "the most streamlined form on the road" and lower by 6 inches (152 mm) than the previous designs. Mason was also a convert to build a large aerodynamically clean family car for the postwar market and even championed the design's enclosed wheels as a bold innovative feature. The resulting car reflected aerodynamic notions of its era, with a rear half resembling the 1935 Stout Scarab.

Nash continued to use the Ambassador name on its top models in 1949. The separate frame chassis of the previous Ambassador was discontinued in favor of unibody construction for the new 1949 models, a design the company introduced to the mass market in 1941 with the 600 series cars. The Ambassador series continued to have a 121 in (3,073 mm) wheelbase and the automaker claimed the new chassis design included 8,000 welds making its "1 1/2 to 2 1/2 times as rigid as conventional cars."

After Nash rolled out its Airflyte body style, Ambassador sales enjoyed a significant gain by selling just four- and two-door sedans in the marketplace from 1949 until 1951. They were manufactured at the Nash Factory (Kenosha, WI) and the Nash Factory (El Segundo, CA).

The Airflytes also featured fully reclining seats that could turn the car into a vehicle capable of sleeping three adults. The 1950 Ambassador became the first non-General Motors automobiles to be equipped with GM's Hydramatic automatic transmissions (cars with the automatic transmission have Selecto-lift starting, where the driver pulled the transmission lever on the column toward themselves to engage the starter). 1949 was the first year for a one-piece curved windshield, and front door wing windows featured curved glass as well.

Mason also believed that once the seller's market following World War II ended, Nash's best hope for survival lay in a product range not addressed by other automakers in the United States at that time – the compact car. With sales of the large Nashes surging ahead of prewar production numbers, Mason began a small car program that would eventually emerge as the compact Nash Rambler, reviving the traditional Rambler marque.

Year	Engine	HP	Transmission	Springs	Wheelbase	Length	Width	Height	Leg room-front
1949	234.8 cu in (3.8 L) 1-bbl I6	112 hp (84 kW; 114 PS)	3-speed manual	Coil-springs	121 in (3,073 mm)	201 in (5,105 mm)	77.5 in (1,968 mm)	63 in (1,600 mm)	41 in (1,041 mm)
1951	234.8 cu in (3.8 L) 1-bbl I6	115 hp (86 kW; 117 PS)	3-speed manual or 4-speed automatic	Coil-Springs	121 in (3,073 mm)	210 in (5,334 mm)	77.5 in (1,968 mm)	63.5 in (1,613 mm)	41 in (1,041 mm)

== 1952–1957 ==
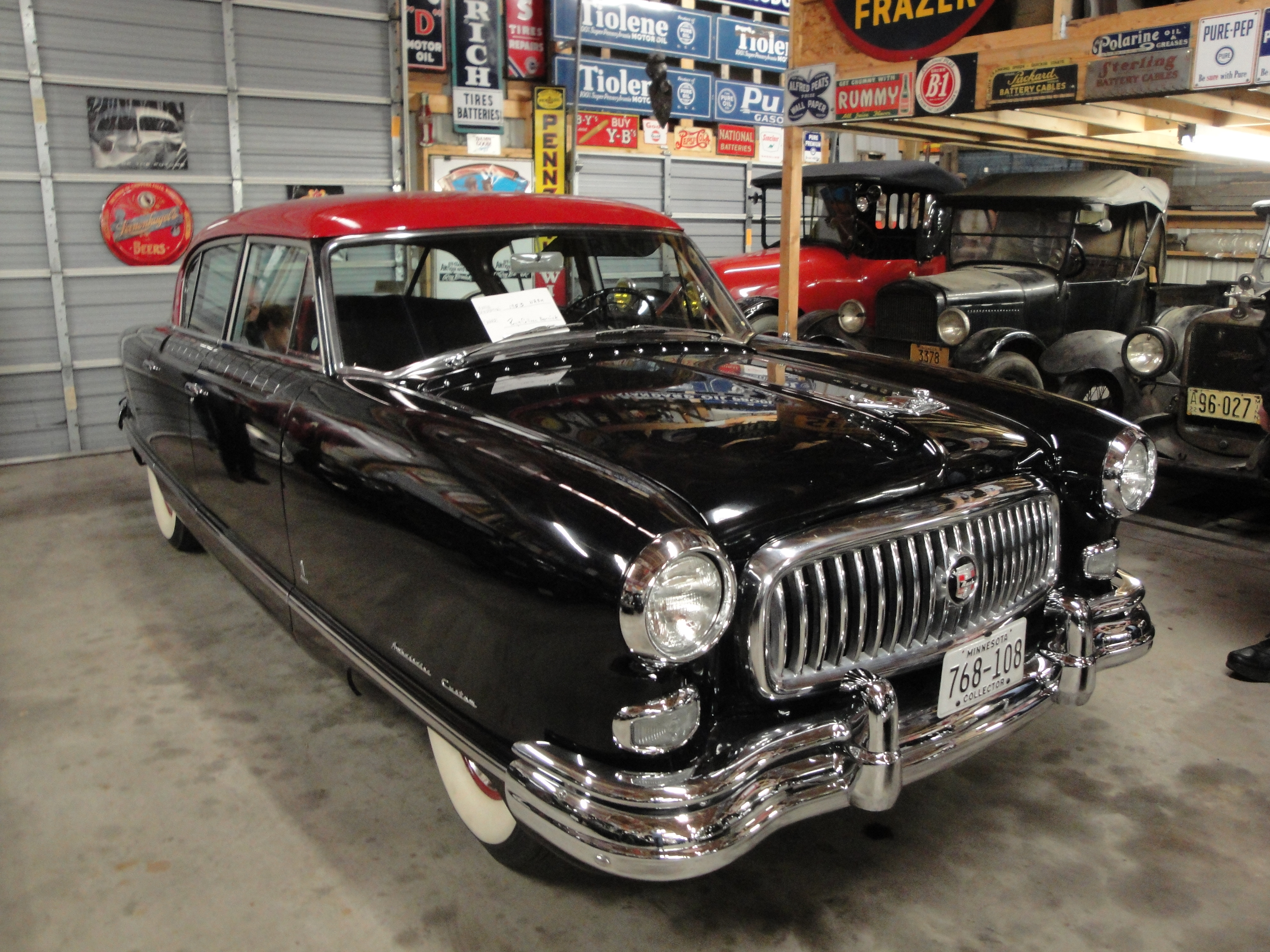
- 1953 Nash Ambassador Custom

Body and chassis
- Body style: 2-door sedan (1952–1954); 4-door sedan; 2-door hardtop
- Layout: Longitudinal front-engine, rear-wheel drive
- Related: Nash Statesman

Powertrain
- Engine: 252.6 cu in (4.1 L) I6; 320 and 352 cu in (5.2 and 5.8 L) Packard V8 (1955 & 1956); 250 cu in (4.1 L) AMC V8; 327 cu in (5.4 L); AMC V8 (1957)
- Transmission: 3-speed manual; 3-speed with overdrive; Hydramatic automatic (I6); Ultramatic automatic (1955-1957 V8)

Dimensions
- Wheelbase: 121.25 in (3,080 mm)
- Length: 204.25 in (5,188 mm); 219.25 in (5,569 mm) with continental spare tire
- Width: 78 in (2,000 mm)
- Height: 62.25 in (1,581 mm)

=== 1952 ===
The Nash Ambassador received a complete restyle for 1952 and celebrated the automaker's 50th anniversary as the predecessor firm, the Thomas B. Jeffery Company, marketed its first cars in 1902.

The Golden Anniversary Nash Airflyte featured styling publicly credited to Pininfarina. Yet, the design was a combination of the Italian coachbuilder with ideas from Edmund E. Anderson, the lead designer at Nash. The new cars had more conventional lines than the previous 1949 through 1951 Ambassadors and they received several design awards. The large "envelope-bodied" sedans followed the pattern of Nash's enclosed wheels along with now larger die cast "toothy" grille bars. Several European touches were incorporated into production such as the reverse-slanted C-pillars and an interior fishnet "parcel holder" mounted above the windshield for keeping maps and sunglasses.

Nash claimed that the Ambassador's comfort and luxury features were so advanced "that other new cars seem outdated in comparison" and advertised the Ambassador as having the broadest and most comfortable seating. The 1952 unit-body design "were good-looking notchbacks" that "looked like nothing on the road," and the cars continued into 1954, almost unchanged. The 1955 models received a revised front grille with integral headlamps. The rear end was redesigned with more pronounced tailfins for 1956, while the final year saw a new front end with "quad" headlamps or two stacked headlamps per side.

=== 1952 ===
The 1952 Ambassador was available in the "Super" and "Custom" series as a two- or four-door sedan and a two-door "Country Club" hardtop. The Super included Nash's basic features with the Custom adding two-tone upholstery with foam-topped seat cushions designed by Helene Rother, an electric clock, directional signals, chrome wheel discs, and automatic interior courtesy lights. Standard was the "Super Jetfire" 252.6 cu in (4.1 L) 120 hp (89 kW; 122 PS) I6 engine and was available with optional dual-range Hydramatic automatic transmission or a Warner Gear overdrive unit.

Due to materials restrictions caused by the Korean War, Nash sales, like many other carmakers, dropped off sharply in 1952.

=== 1953 ===
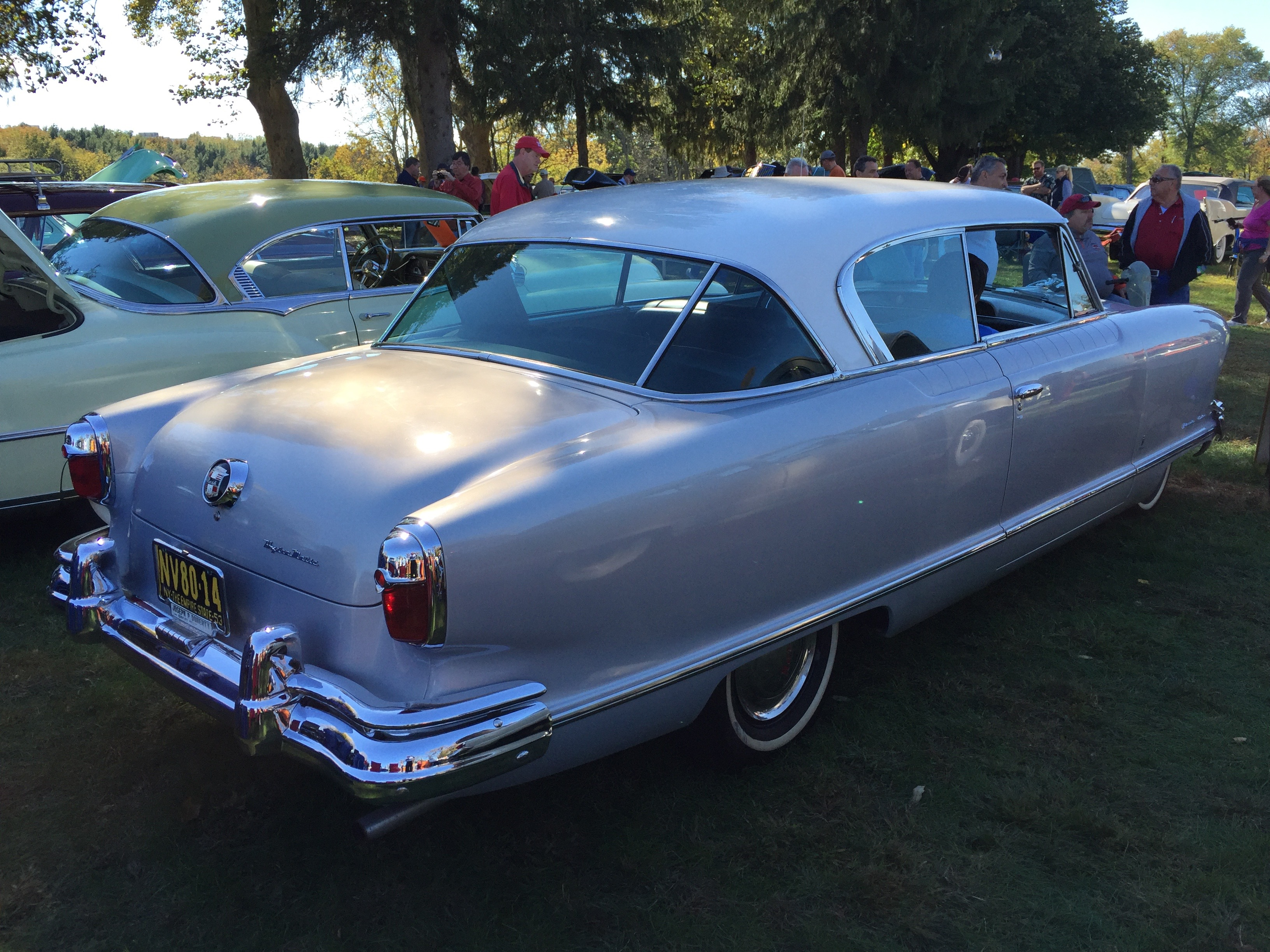
1953 Nash Ambassador hardtop

The Ambassador received minor changes, such as small chrome spacers on the cowl air scoop. Ambassadors were available with dual carburetors and a high-compression aluminum head producing 140 hp (104 kW; 142 PS) as the "Le Mans" option as from the Nash-Healey.

With the end of the Korean War, a battle for market leadership began between two historic rival automakers, Ford and Chevrolet. There was also a shift from a seller's to a buyer's market, making it more difficult for the smaller U.S. automakers to compete with the Big Three (Ford, GM, and Chrysler). The Big Three could afford annual styling changes to enhance their sales appeal. To differentiate the model and its styling by Pinin Farina of Europe, as well as the luxury custom interiors and the record-setting Le Mans Dual Jet-Fire engine, Nash advertised the Ambassador Country Club hardtop with the headline "To the Boy Who Wanted a Stutz Bearcat", inviting men to recall their youthful dreams (arguably the first true American sportscar) by driving the 1953 Ambassador "to thrill to the wonder and romance of travel again".

=== 1954 ===
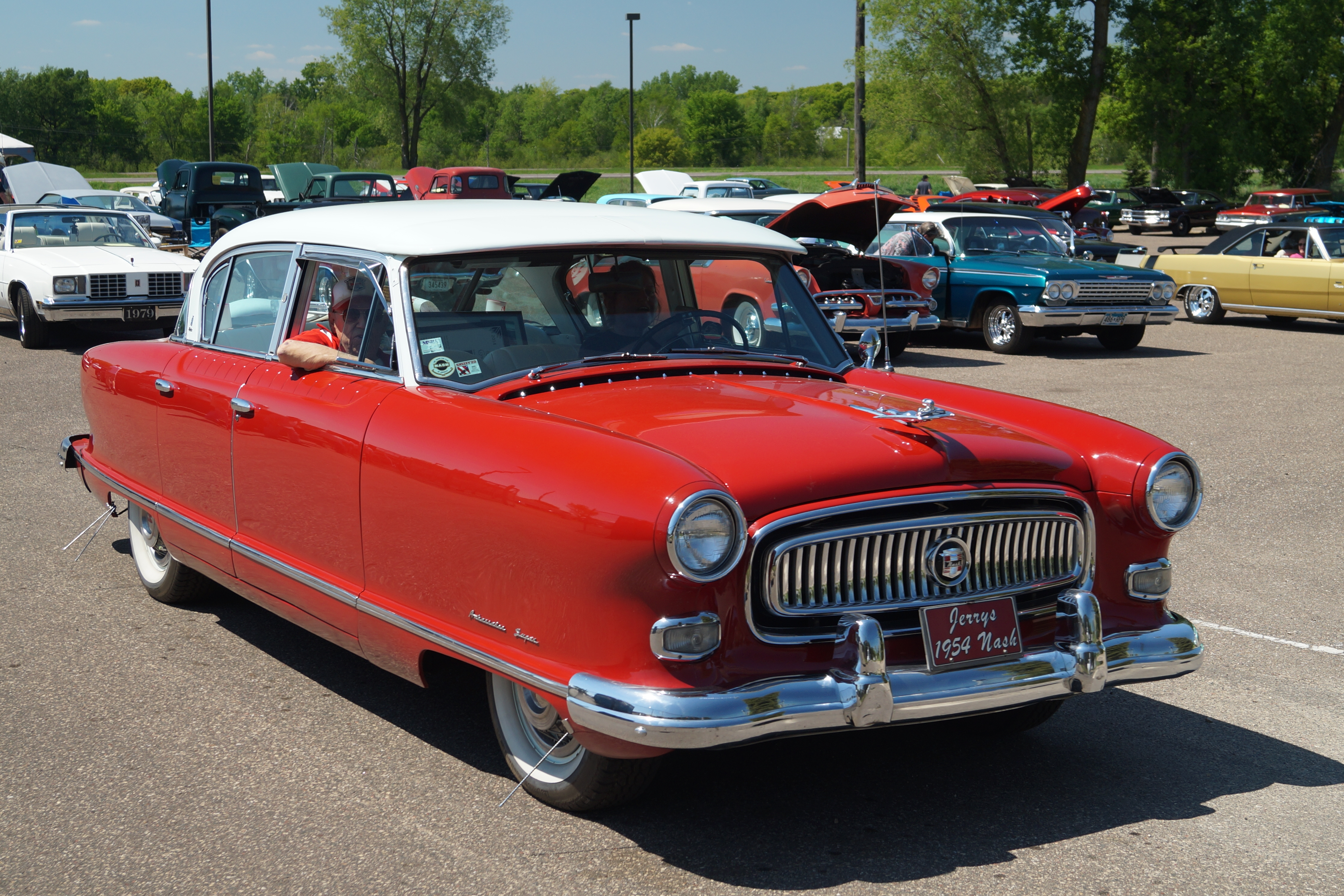
1954 Nash Ambassador Custom sedan

In 1954 the Nash Ambassador was the first American automobile to have a front-end, fully integrated heating, ventilating, and air-conditioning system. The heating and ventilation system was called Weather Eye and now could be equipped with Nash-Kelvinators' advanced Automobile air conditioning unit. While other manufacturers in America at the time offered A/C on some models, their air conditioning units were driven by a large and heavy, trunk mounted expander and heat exchanger that carried the air into the car via clear plastic tubes and out through ceiling mounted vents. Nash's unit was inexpensive, compact, fit under the hood, and could circulate fresh or recycled air. With a single thermostatic control, the Nash passenger compartment air cooling option was described as "a good and remarkably inexpensive" system. The option was priced well below systems offered by other carmakers (in 1955, Nash offered it at US$345, against $550 for Oldsmobile or $570 for Chrysler); other makers, such as Ford, did not even offer optional air conditioning. (At the time, even a heater was not always standard equipment.)

The Ambassador continued with only a few changes. A new "floating" grille concave grille and partially chromed headlamp bezels were added to the front end. A redesigned instrument panel was a major change inside. The base trim was called "Super," while the higher "Custom" models featured a continental spare tire carrier, and many other upgrades were available in four-door sedan and two-door "Country Club" hardtop forms. The standard 252.6 cu in (4.1 L) I6 was now rated at 130 hp (97 kW; 132 PS) at 3,700 rpm with its 7.6:1 compression ratio and a one-barrel Carter carburetor.

A sales war developed between Ford and General Motors between 1953 and 1954, leaving little business for the other domestic automakers. Ford and Chevrolet were shipping their standard size models to their respective dealers no matter if there were any orders for them. A price war with deep discounts to sell these cars meant declining sales for the independent carmakers (Hudson, Kaiser, Nash, Packard, and Studebaker).

The future for Nash and other automakers was bleak because they lacked the "huge mass production, key distribution points and the income safety of General Motors, Ford Motor Co. and Chrysler Corp." Under the leadership of George W. Mason, Nash-Kelvinator merged with ailing Hudson Motor Car Company on 14 January 1954, to form American Motors Corporation (AMC).

Although the "senior" Nash and Hudson models continued to be marketed, sales of the Rambler were powering the newly-formed company's bottom line. This was as Nash and Hudson dealers sold the compact-sized Ramblers that were identical save for the "Nash" or "Hudson" badging. As the Rambler's fortunes increased, sales of the senior Nash cars, including the Ambassador, decreased. A total of 21,428 Ambassadors were built in 1954.

=== 1955 ===
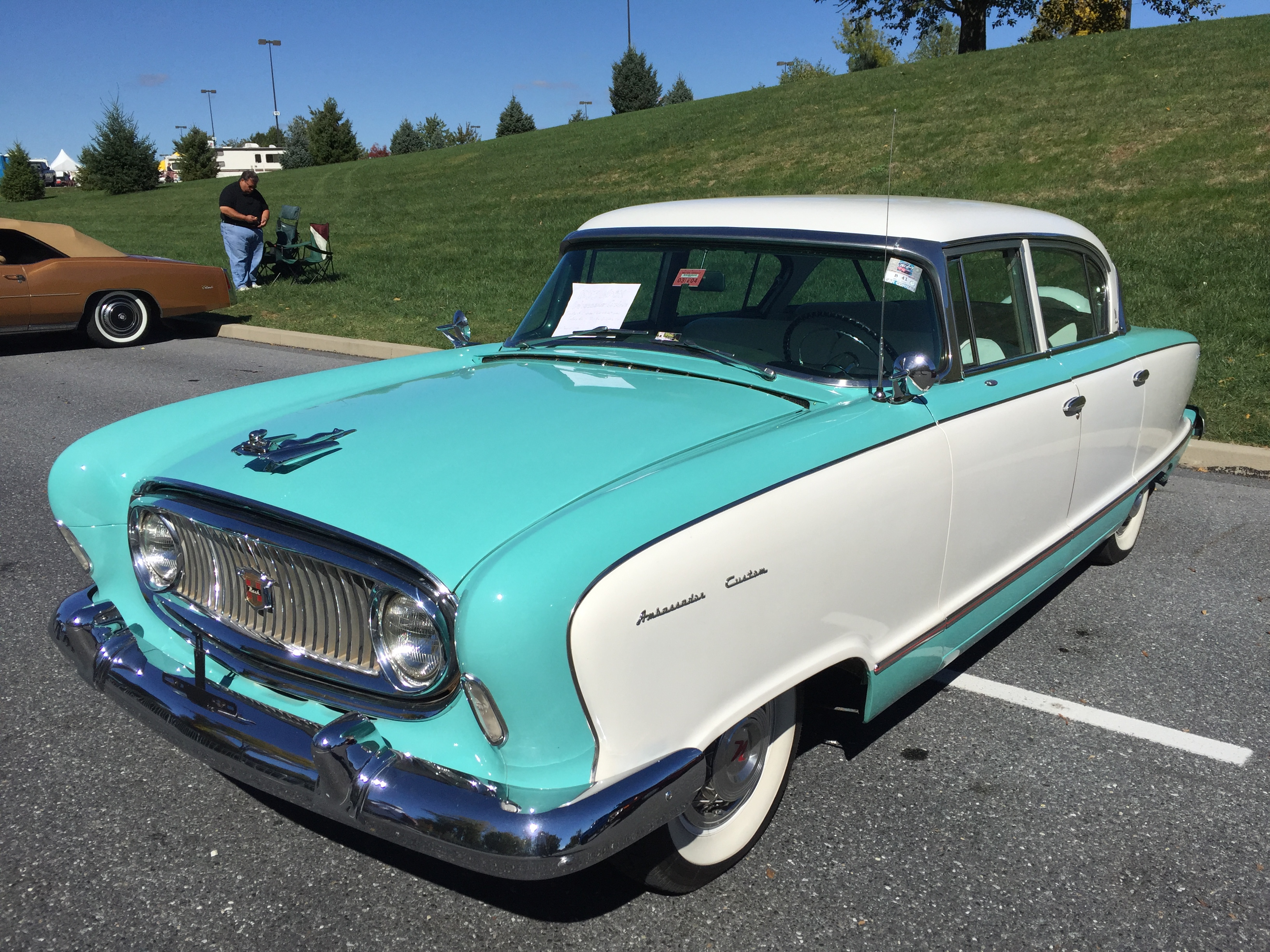
1955 Nash Ambassador Custom sedan LeMans

The Airflyte styling entered its final season with the heavily facelifted 1955 versions created under the direction of Edmund E. Anderson. "Scenaramic" wrap-around windshields accompanied a new front-end treatment with a new oval grille incorporating the headlights. The front fenders featured raised front wheel arches that showed more of the front wheel and tire than Nash had revealed since the 1949 models debuted. Ambassadors were now available with a V8 engine for the first time. The engine was supplied by Packard as part of George W. Mason's vision to have Packard join AMC to help achieve the economies of scale of the domestic Big Three automakers. The 320 cu in (5.2 L) V8 produced 208 hp (155 kW; 211 PS) and mated to Packard's Ultramatic automatic transmission.

=== 1956 ===
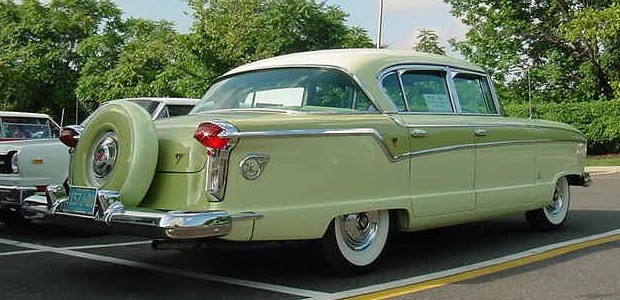
1956 Nash Ambassador sedan with Continental kit

Ambassador models fielded for 1956 were heavily re-styled in the rear with big "lollipop" taillights, and the cars were offered in a variety of two- and three-tone color schemes. The Ambassador line up was reduced to Super sedans with I6 engines as well as V8 powered Super and Custom sedans and the hardtop Custom Country Club. The Packard V8 was upped to the 352 CID model and available for the entire model year. In April 1956 AMC introduced its 250 cu in (4.1 L) V8 engine producing 190 bhp (142 kW; 193 PS). The AMC 250 V8 was only used in the Nash Ambassador Special and the Hudson Hornet Special. The "Specials" were the lighter (by ~350 pounds) and shorter Statesman and Wasp bodies with Ambassador and Hornet trim.

=== 1957 ===
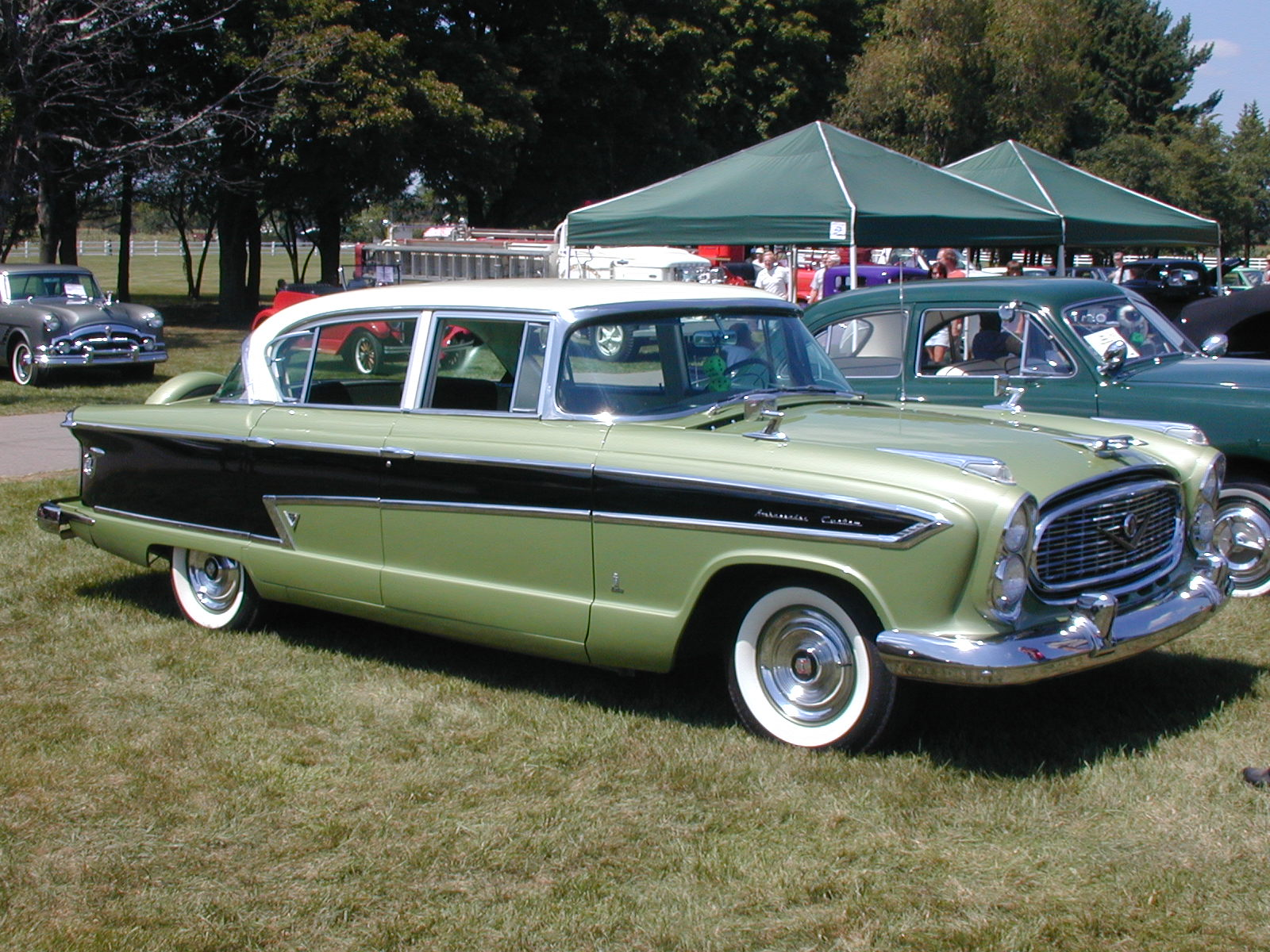
1957 Nash Ambassador Custom Four-Door Sedan

The 1957 models were the first cars equipped with "quad" headlights as standard equipment. They were vertically stacked in the front fender "pontoons". The 1957 models featured enlarged front wheel well openings to almost "normal" size. The wheels were now 14-inch with standard 8.00x14 tires.

The standard engine for the 1957 Ambassador was AMC's V8, a modern overhead valve design displacing 327 cu in (5.4 L). This was an enlarged version of the 1956 250 with the same stroke (3.25") and a larger bore (4.0" compared to 3.5" -- different block castings). It featured a forged steel crankshaft, a 4-barrel carburetor, and dual exhausts. The new engine was rated at 255 hp (190 kW; 259 PS) and 345 lb⋅ft (468 N⋅m) of torque. Available were a three-speed manual transmission, an automatic overdrive unit, or Packard's Ultramatic automatic transmission. The Custom models standard features included power brakes, individually adjustable reclining front seats, rear seat center armrest, and hood ornament. Special leather seating surfaces and a continental tire kit were optional.

After the production of under 3,600 big Nash cars, the final Nash Ambassador rolled off the Kenosha, Wisconsin production line in 1957.

== Racing ==
=== Endurance ===
Eight Nash Ambassadors were entered in the 1950 Carrera Panamericana, a 2,172-mile (3,495 km) endurance race run over five days across Mexico. 47 of the 126 cars that started this "contest of heroic proportions and vast distances" were classified as finishers. Three Ambassadors finished all nine stages, but the highest-placed car was disqualified.

The 1950 Ambassador, driven by Roy Pat Conner, was in sixth place after the eighth stage, 33 minutes behind the leader, when Connor became too ill to continue. Curtis Turner, who shared another 1950 Ambassador with Bill France Sr., purchased Conner's car for its superior race position, replacing Conner at the wheel and leaving France to continue in their original car without him. On the final stage Piero Taruffi, arguably the most experienced road racer in the field, had moved his Alfa Romeo 6C up to the fourth position when Turner passed him in the mountains by bumping the Italian "Southern-style" until he yielded. Taruffi repassed the Nash when a flat tire temporarily halted it. At the finish, Taruffi was in Turner's sights, but Turner ended ahead in elapsed time, beating Taruffi by 3.5 minutes. This put Turner in third place overall, behind a Cadillac 62. He was disqualified when a quick review by the race officials showed that the rules specifically prohibited changing a car's crew.

Bill France eventually crashed out of the race. Still, the damaged car was driven back to the United States, where France and Turner used it for an entire season of dirt track racing in the Southern states. Mexican driver S. Santoyo was classified 36th in his 1949 Nash, while another 1949 Ambassador driven by Manuel Luz Meneses and José O'Farrill Larranoga finished 39th. Another four Nashes crashed out, while a fifth retired with engine trouble.

=== NASCAR ===
The Nash Motor Company was the first manufacturer actively supporting NASCAR racing. Direct factory sponsorship was provided for the 1950 and 1951 Grand National seasons. For 1950, Nash recruited and signed dynamic stars Curtis Turner and Johnny Mantz.

- North Wilkesboro Speedway - On 24 September 1950, Ebenezer "Slick" Smith drove a Nash Ambassador, but crashed midway through the race and finished 20th in the field of 26. This was the same car that Bill France had crashed in the Carrera Panamericana.
- Carrell Speedway (Gardena, California) - On 8 April 1951, Johnny Mantz's Nash Ambassador finished the 200-lap race in second place. However, Ebenezer "Slick" Smith was driving the car at the checkered flag in relief for Mantz.

For the 1951 NASCAR season, other automakers became more involved in sponsorship.

- Daytona Beach Road Course - On February 11 - Bill Holland driving a Nash Ambassador encountered mechanical trouble early in the season-opening event to finish 47th from the 54-cars that started the NASCAR Grand National race.
- Charlotte Speedway - On April 1 - Curtis Turner won the 150-lap NASCAR Grand National race with his Nash Ambassador. This was the only first-place finish for the large-sized Nash Ambassador in the NASCAR Grand National series. The car driven to victory in the 400-lap NASCAR Short Track Grand National race in Lanham, Maryland by Tony Bonadies on July 14, 1951, was the new compact-sized Nash Rambler.
- Michigan State Fairgrounds Speedway - On August 12 - The 1951 Nash Ambassador, was the Official Pace Car of the "Motor City 250" stock car race, and was driven by NASCAR's president, Bill France. Tim Flock won the race in a Hudson, earned $7,001 in cash, as well as a new Nash Ambassador.

=== Legacy ===
The newly formed American Motors Corporation, which resulted from the merger of Nash and Hudson, continued the Nash Ambassador as the top-of-the-line. However, sales of the full-sized Nash models decreased in the early 1950s, while the popularity of the compact Ramblers increased, and the Ambassadors were moved to a new lengthened Rambler platform with many standard features to carry on as the flagship models.

The cars were named Rambler Ambassador from 1958 through the 1965 model year. The model had no real competitors throughout most of the 1960s and was viewed as a luxury-type car.

American Motors' flagship line was marketed as the AMC Ambassador starting from 1966, with continual facelifts and improvements, such as making air conditioning standard equipment, through their discontinuation after the 1974 model year.

The 47-year history of the Ambassador line of cars that began in 1927 established it as one of the longest-lived automobile nameplates on record through the 1970s. In comparison, the Chevrolet Suburban, which continues to be built, entered the marketplace in 1935 with a "Carryall" barge was one of many vehicles to bear the Suburban nameplate from several automakers.
