= Packard Four Hundred =

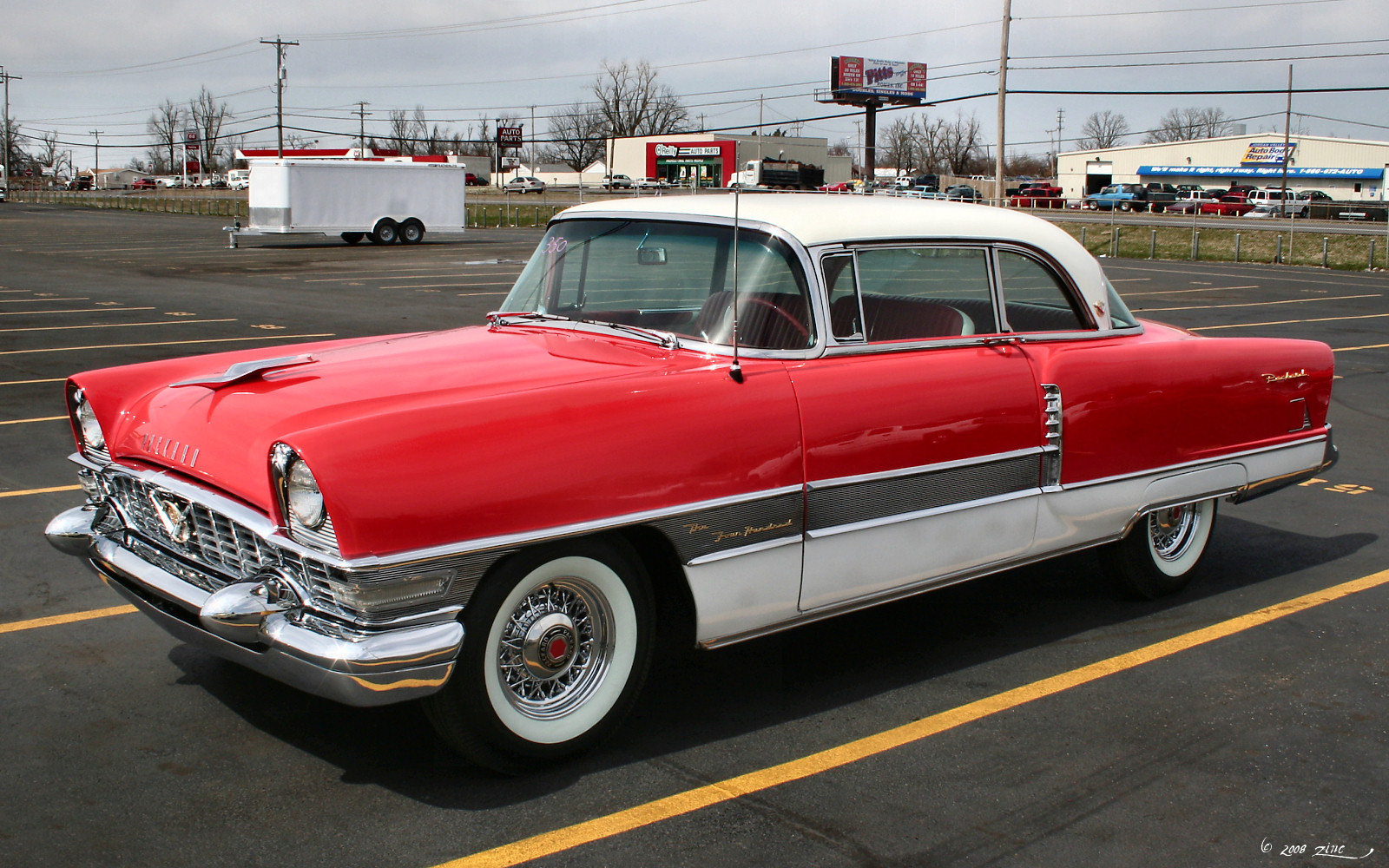
- 1955 Packard Four Hundred

Overview
- Manufacturer: Packard
- Production: 1955 to 1956

Body and chassis
- Body style: 2-door hardtop coupe
- Layout: FR
- Related: Packard Patrician; Packard Caribbean

The Packard Four Hundred was an automobile built by the Studebaker-Packard Corporation of South Bend, Indiana during model years 1955 and 1956. During its two years in production, the Four Hundred was built in Packard’s Detroit facilities, and considered part of Packard's senior model range.

Between 1951 and the time the final Detroit-built Packard rolled off the line in 1956, Packard’s marketing strategy and model naming convention was in a constant state of flux as the automaker struggled to redefine itself as a producer of luxury automobiles, and separate itself from its volume selling Packard models which it designated the Packard Clipper. As a result, Packard fielded several models which existed for a single year during this period.

In 1951 and 1952 the automaker attempted to use a numeric naming structure that designated Packard’s junior models as Packard 200 and Packard 250 and its senior vehicles as the Packard 300, and bearing the highest trim level available, the Packard Patrician 400. The Patrician 400 replaced the previous model year’s Packard Custom Super Eight model range.

The 400 model name was dropped from the Patrician model range at the beginning of the 1953 model range, however the Patrician name continued to occupy the premium trim level Packard from 1953 through 1956.

== 1955 and 1956 ==
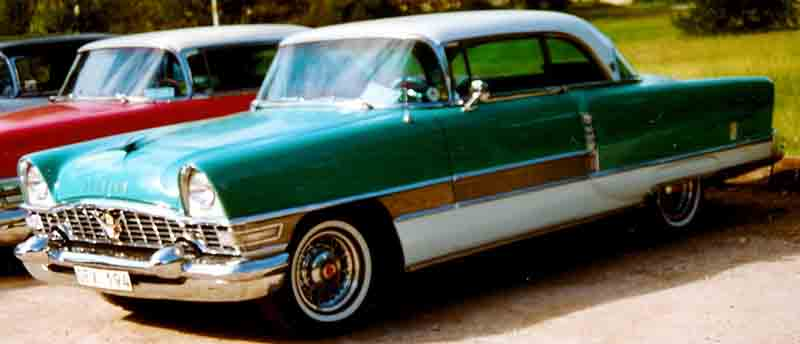
1955 Packard Four Hundred (Series 5580)

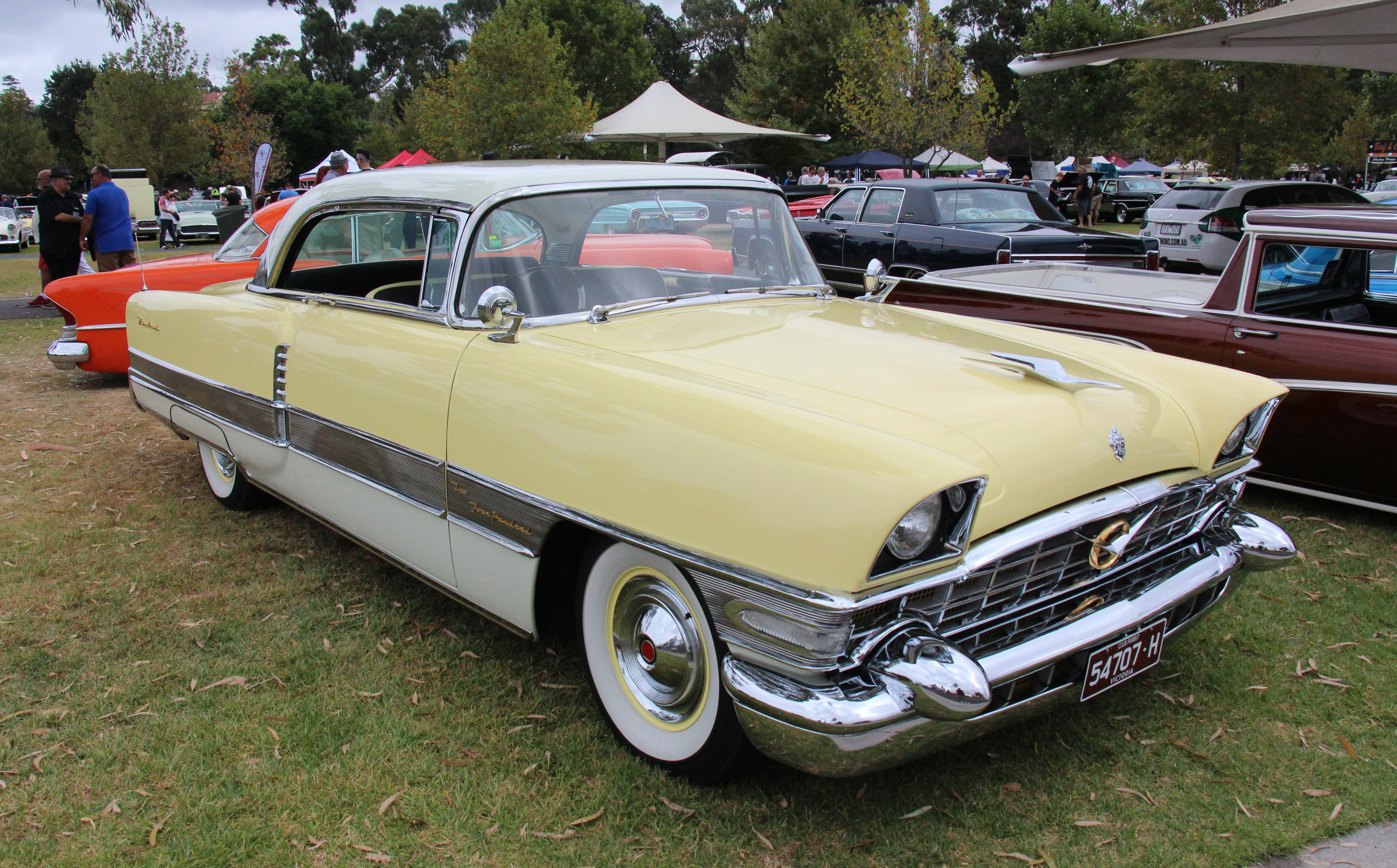
1956 Packard Four Hundred (Series 5680)

For 1955 the Four Hundred name was re-employed by Packard and assigned to the automaker's senior model range two-door hardtop. Visual cues that helped to easily identify the 400 included a full color band along the lower portion of the car topped by a partial color band that truncated along the rear edge of the front doors. "The Four Hundred" in gold anodized script adorned the band between the front wheel well and door edge.

Changes to the 1956 Four Hundred followed those changes to the entire senior Packard line as it attempted to further distance itself from the Clipper, which was now its own marque in 1956. The Four Hundred shared its body and chassis with the more expensive, new-for-'56 Caribbean hardtop.

Senior Packards received a new grille texture and multi-tone paint schemes. The cars also received an altered headlight housing, with a slightly longer hood stretching over the headlight, as well as a more distinctive egg-crate grille over 1955. All 1956 senior Packards moved the Packard crest to the front of the hood, leaving the "circle-V" emblem in the grille looking somewhat bare.

Power was increased as the new-for-1956 V8 was enlarged from 352 to 374 cubic inches, with a corresponding upgrade in horsepower ratings. A new electronic push-button control for the Ultramatic automatic transmission was offered as an option on the Four Hundred (and Patrician series, standard on Caribbean), the push-buttons located on a pod mounted via a stalk off the steering column. Although sophisticated, it proved troublesome. A simpler column-mounted selector was standard equipment.

In 1956, Studebaker-Packard’s financial position deteriorated to the point where the automaker could no longer afford the luxury of maintaining two distinct makes of cars produced in two distinct facilities. For 1957 Studebaker-Packard fielded a single model range, the Clipper. By the end of the 1958 model year the Packard name ceased as an automotive brand in the United States.

Production totals for 1955 came to 7,206 units for the Packard Four Hundred, and 3,224 units for 1956.
