= Glove compartment =

Compartment built into the dashboard of an automobile

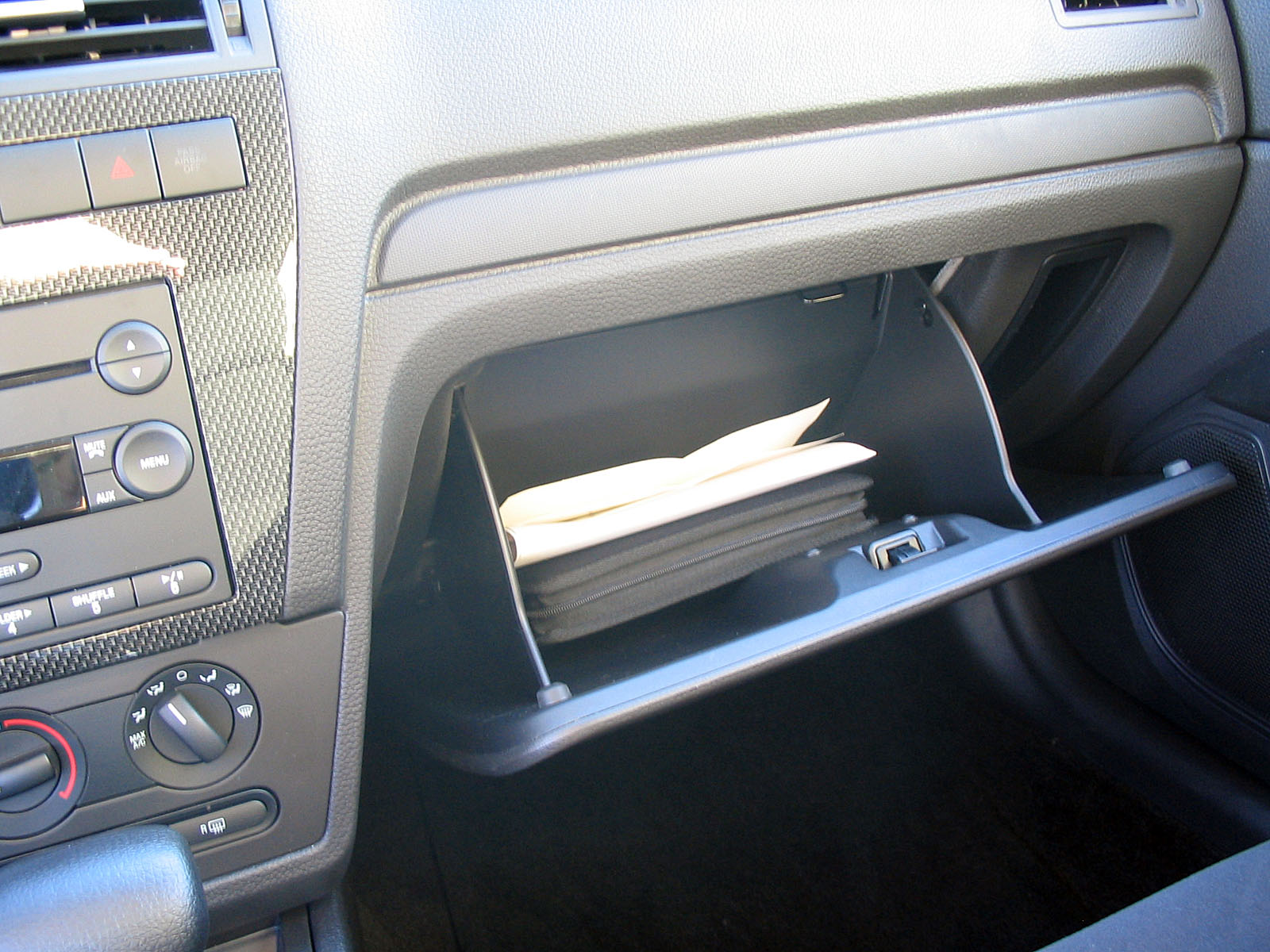
Glove compartment of a Ford Fusion with an owner's manual visible

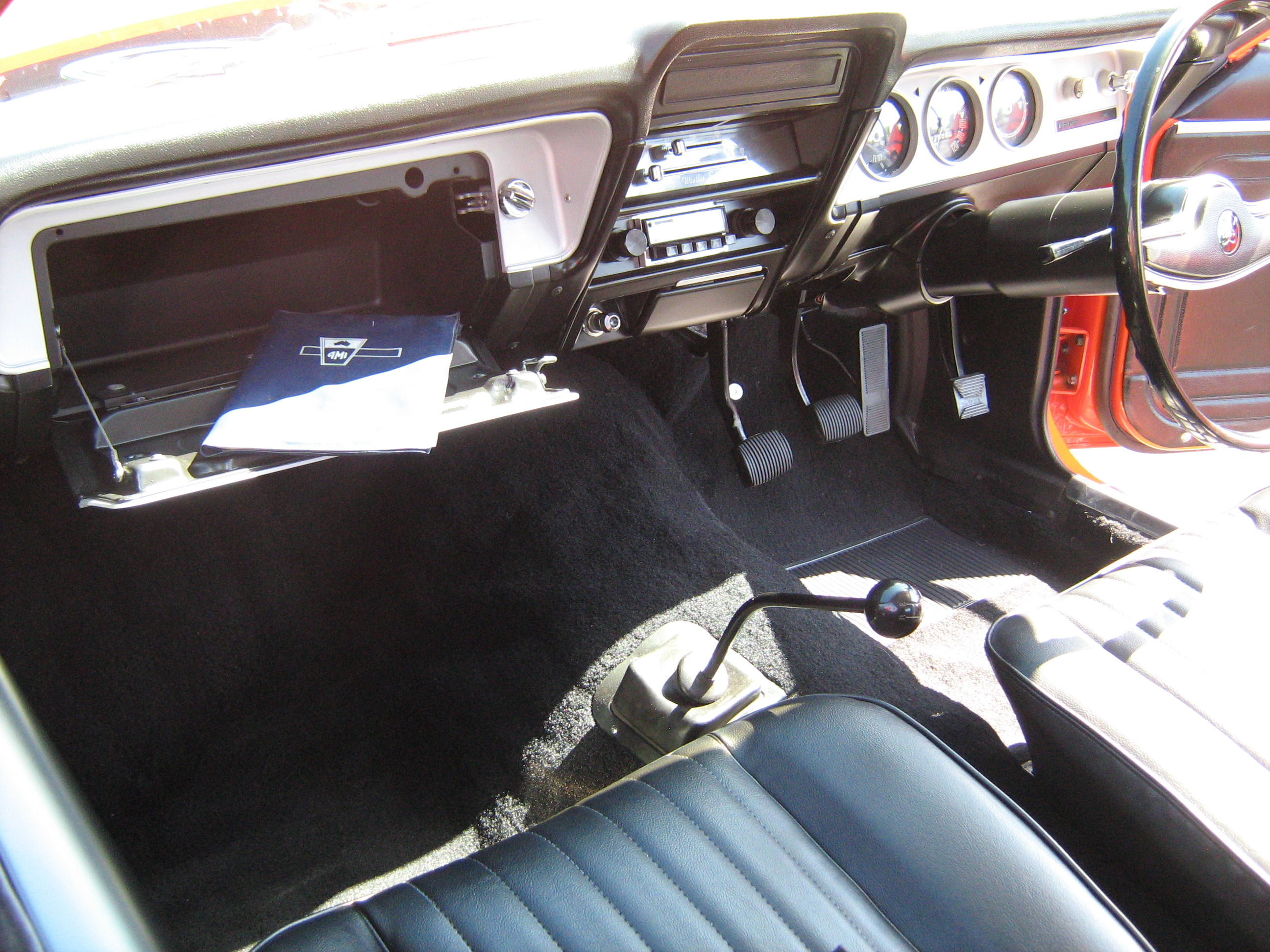
Open glove box of a right-hand drive car assembled in Australia by Australian Motor Industries (AMI)

A glove compartment or glove box is a compartment built into the dashboard of an automobile, located over the front-seat passenger's footwell, and often used for miscellaneous storage. The name derives from the original purpose of the compartment, to store driving gloves. They were sometimes in a box on the floorboard near the driver, hence the phrase "glove box". In most vehicles, the glove compartment closes with a latch, with the option of being locked with a key (often desirable when using valet service, when parking with the convertible top down, or when the compartment contains a mechanism to open the trunk).

== History ==
An early innovation was the addition of a storage compartment on the front or dashboard of the 1900 Packard.

Driving gloves were considered necessary equipment in early cars, many of which were mostly open to the weather, to prevent the cooling effect of fast-moving air from numbing drivers' hands. Gloves are still considered necessary equipment on motorcycles for the same reason, although, unlike cars, most motorcycles do not have glove boxes. Some scooters, particularly older models, may include a small storage compartment on the front leg shield, such as on the Vespa PK series.

According to the BBC Four program Penelope Keith and the Fast Lady (Aaron Syer), Dorothy Levitt coined the phrase glove compartment as she advised motorists to carry a number of pairs of gloves to deal with many eventualities.

In some vehicles, the inside of the compartment's door may have an indented area for cups or beverage containers when open. These were for use while at a drive-in while the car was stationary, not in the modern applications of cup holders. Some glove compartments have sections for holding a pen or pencil. There were storage compartments on the backs of the seats to hold a woman's bag or rain apparel in the 1955 and 1956 Dodge La Femme. The 1957 Cadillac Eldorado Brougham featured a cocktail set with magnetized cups in its dashboard compartment.

In some newer cars, the glove compartment may be temperature-controlled, so that it can be used as a cooler for beverages such as on the Dodge Caliber. Some cars now have multiple compartments.

In the past, glove compartments typically contained an internal light. This light automatically turned on when the box was opened, helping to search its contents. From the 2000s, many manufacturers have not provided this light, to cut costs, even in luxury vehicles.

== See also ==
- Center console (automobile)
- List of auto parts
