= Packard Four =

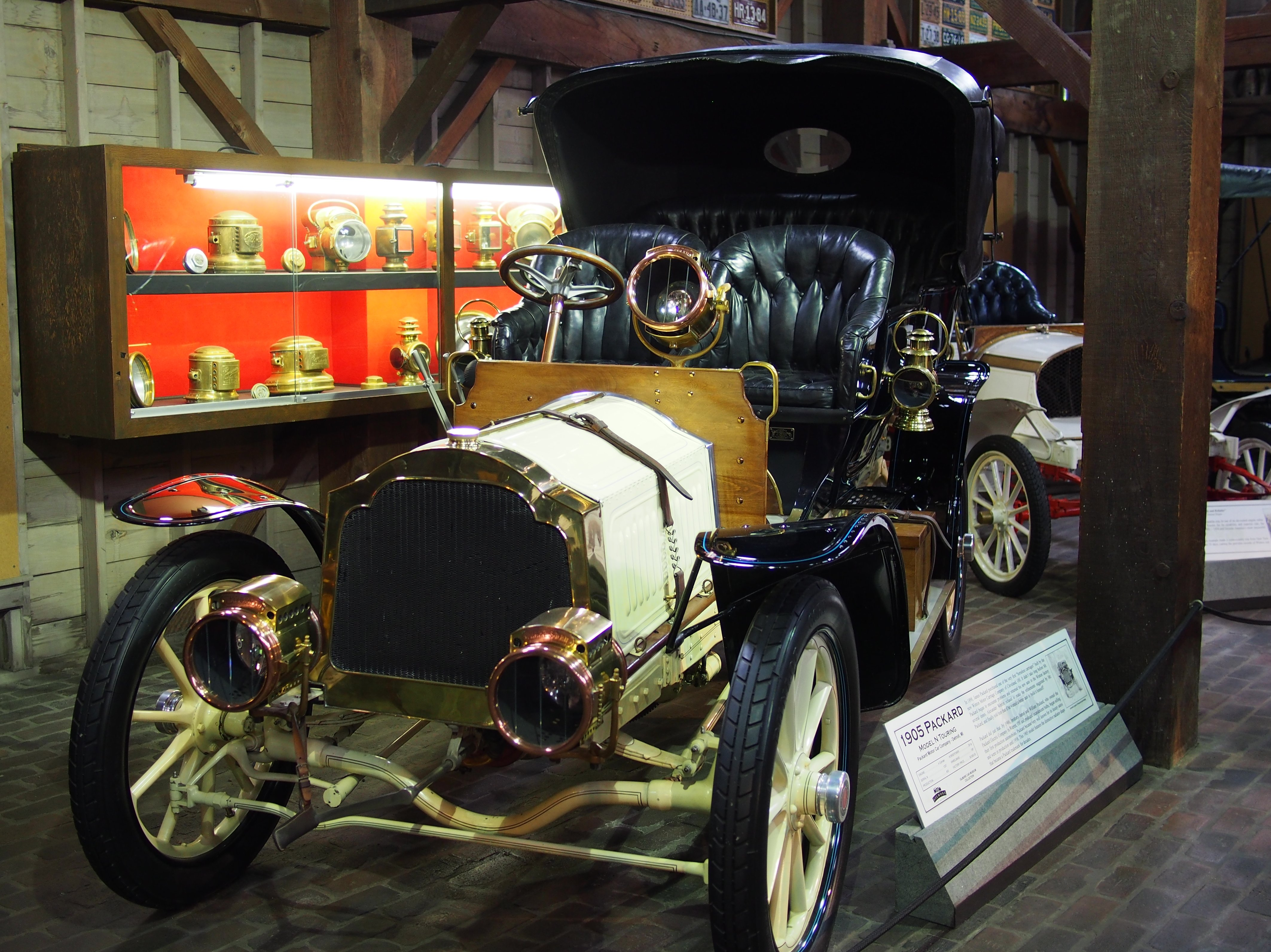
- 1905 Packard Model N Touring Sedan - Museum of the Horseless Carriage at Gilmore Car Museum in Hickory Corners, MI

Overview
- Manufacturer: Packard Motor Car Company
- Production: 1903–1912
- Assembly: Packard Automotive Plant, Detroit, MI

Body and chassis
- Layout: Front-engine, rear-wheel drive

Powertrain
- Engine: 241.7 cu in (3,961 cc) L-head (1903-1904); 265.7 cu in (4,354 cc) L-head (1905); 349.9 cu in (5,734 cc) T-head (1906); 431.9 cu in (7,078 cc) T-head (1907-1908); 265.7 cu in (4,354 cc) T-head (1909 Model Eighteen NA); 267.5 cu in (4,384 cc) T-head (1910-1912 Model Eighteen NB, NC, NE); 431.9 cu in (7,078 cc) T-head (1909-1912 Model Thirty UB, UBS, UC, UCS, UD, UDS, UE)

Chronology
- Predecessor: Packard Model G
- Successor: Packard Six

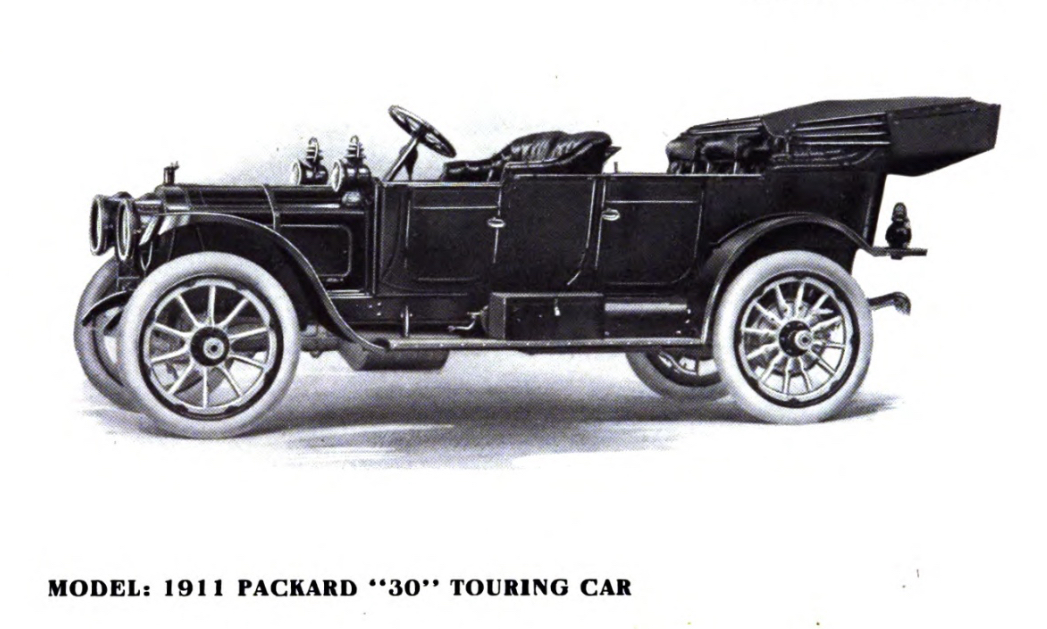
Packard Model UA (1908-1912)

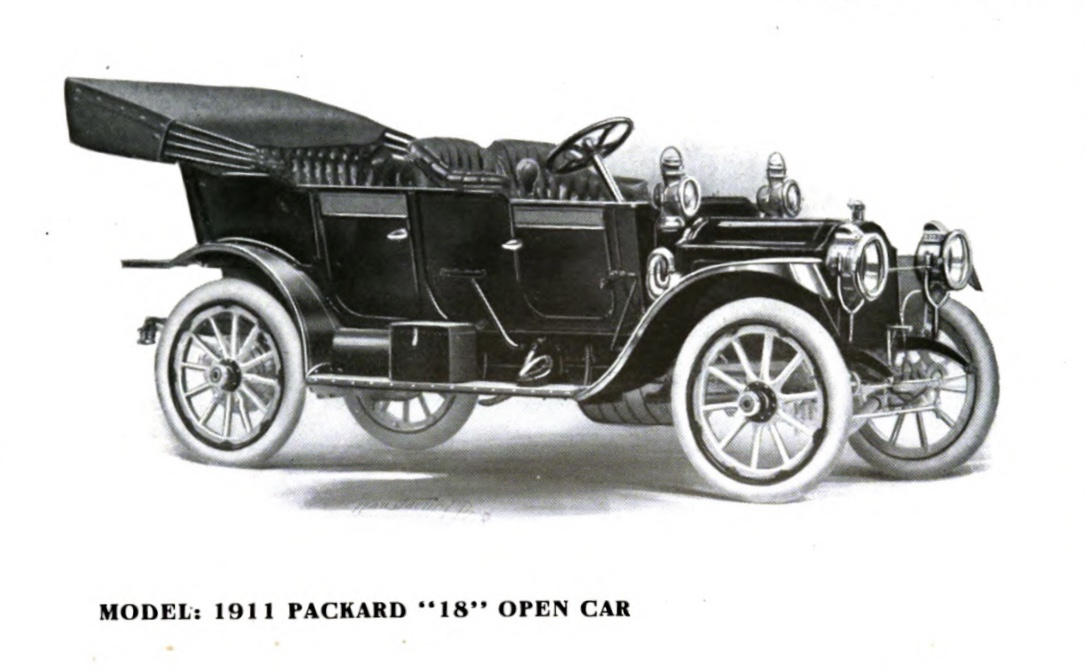
Packard Model NA (1909-1912)

The Packard Motor Car Company introduced their first four-cylinder engine in 1903 initially as a top level car along with the Packard Model F. It was their only automobile offered and exclusively used a four-cylinder engine from 1903 until 1912 and established Packard as a luxury car maker, and was replaced by the 1913 Packard Six.

== History ==
The first four-cylinder equipped car was introduced as the 1903 Model K with rear entrance tonneau or King of Belgium tonneau body styles. It introduced a number of firsts for the company, to include installing the engine in front of the passenger compartment and the radiator with a grille, with a four speed transmission using a 92 in (2,336.8 mm) wheelbase. Production was limited to 34 with a retail price of US$7,300 ($261,583 in 2025 dollars) making it the most expensive Packard manufactured. Packard engineer Charles Schmidt raced a Model K Gray Wolf at Ormond-Daytona Beach and achieved 77.6 mph.

The 1904 Model L & Model M introduced the characteristic sculpted radiator and flat hood appearance, while the body was constructed in aluminum over wood frame. The standard body color was painted Richelieu blue with black molding with cream yellow striping, while the running gear was painted cream yellow with black and blue striping. Three body styles were offered adding a surrey and runabout to the previous tonneau, with a retail price of US$3,000 ($107,500 in 2025 dollars).

Another first for the company was introduced with the 1905 Model N, adding a touring sedan, brougham, and limousine to the runabout, while the surrey was omitted. The wheelbase was extended to 106 in (2,692.4 mm). Retail prices started at US$3,600 to US$4,600 for the limousine ($164,833 in 2025 dollars).

1906 saw more mechanical and appearance advancements on the Model S, which was also marketed as the Model 24, referring to a claimed 24 bhp T-head engine. Two wheelbases were offered for the first time, where the runabout used a 108 in (2,743.2 mm), while the touring sedan, limousine, landaulet, and victoria used the longer 119 in (3,022.6 mm). Another trademark appearance feature was introduced; the hexagon shaped hubcap, which had the center painted black until 1913 when it was changed to red and remained so until the company closed. The Landaulet could be purchased for US$5,225 ($187,229 in 2025 dollars).

For 1907 Packard changed the model designation from letters to engine horsepower, so it was now identified as the Model Thirty Series U (spelled out instead of a number). Prices at introduction started with $4200 for open models and went up to $5500 for the limousine and $5600 for the landaulet. Two wheelbases were offered with the runabout bodystyle on the 108 in (2,743.2 mm) while the touring sedan, limousine and landaulet using the 122 in (3,098.8 mm).

Packard continued its focus on continuous improvement, and for 1908 the Model Thirty added a second designation called the Series UA. The runabout used the 108 in (2,743.2 mm) wheelbase while the Touring Sedan and Limousine used the longer 123.5 in (3,136.9 mm) wheelbase and the Touring Coupe was now available with a rumble seat.

In 1909, Packard decided to offer an affordable choice to widen their customer base, and introduced the Model Eighteen Series NA which was priced US$1,000 lower ($35,833 in 2025 dollars). The Model Eighteen offered a smaller engine and shorter wheelbase, while the Model Thirty Series UB and UBS remained the upper level vehicle. The Series UB designation was for the longer wheelbase, while the Series UBS designation was for the shorter wheelbase shared with the Model Eighteen. As body styles continued to adapt to customer requests, Packard offered a Demi-Limousine to its list of available coach offerings on both the Model Eighteen with a 112 in (2,844.8 mm) wheelbase, and Model Thirty using a 123.5 in (3,136.9 mm) wheelbase.

The lower priced platform returned for 1910 as the Model Eighteen Series NB and was mechanically related to the previous year, while the demi-limousine didn't return as an available body style and only four choices remained. The Model Thirty Series UC and UCS added a phaeton, demi-limousine and town car to the list of body styles along with shock absorbers to smooth the ride. Engine choices and wheelbases remained unchanged.

A 1911 Four-door Landaulet cost $5,750 ($198,683 in 2025 dollars). Standard equipment included oil lamps, a tool kit, and two extra demountable rims. The closed cars also included speaking tubes, adjustable ventilators, and a dome light that had a separate battery. There was a speedometer and an air-pressure gauge. Wheelbase was 123 1/2" for the standard chassis.

In 1911 Packard introduced the Packard Six as a 1912 model and phased out the four-cylinder Model 30 Series UE and Model 18 Series NE.

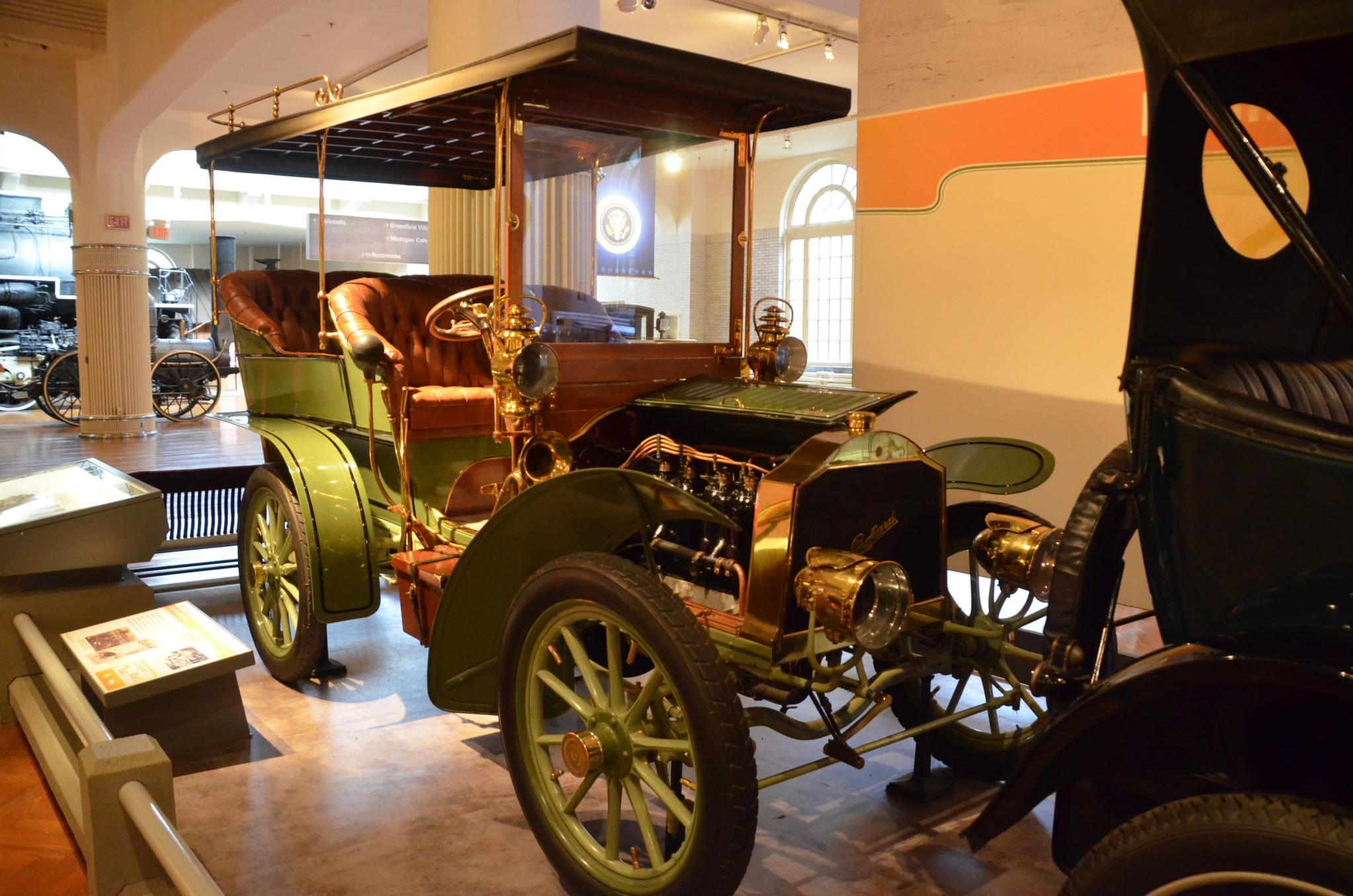
1904 Packard Model L

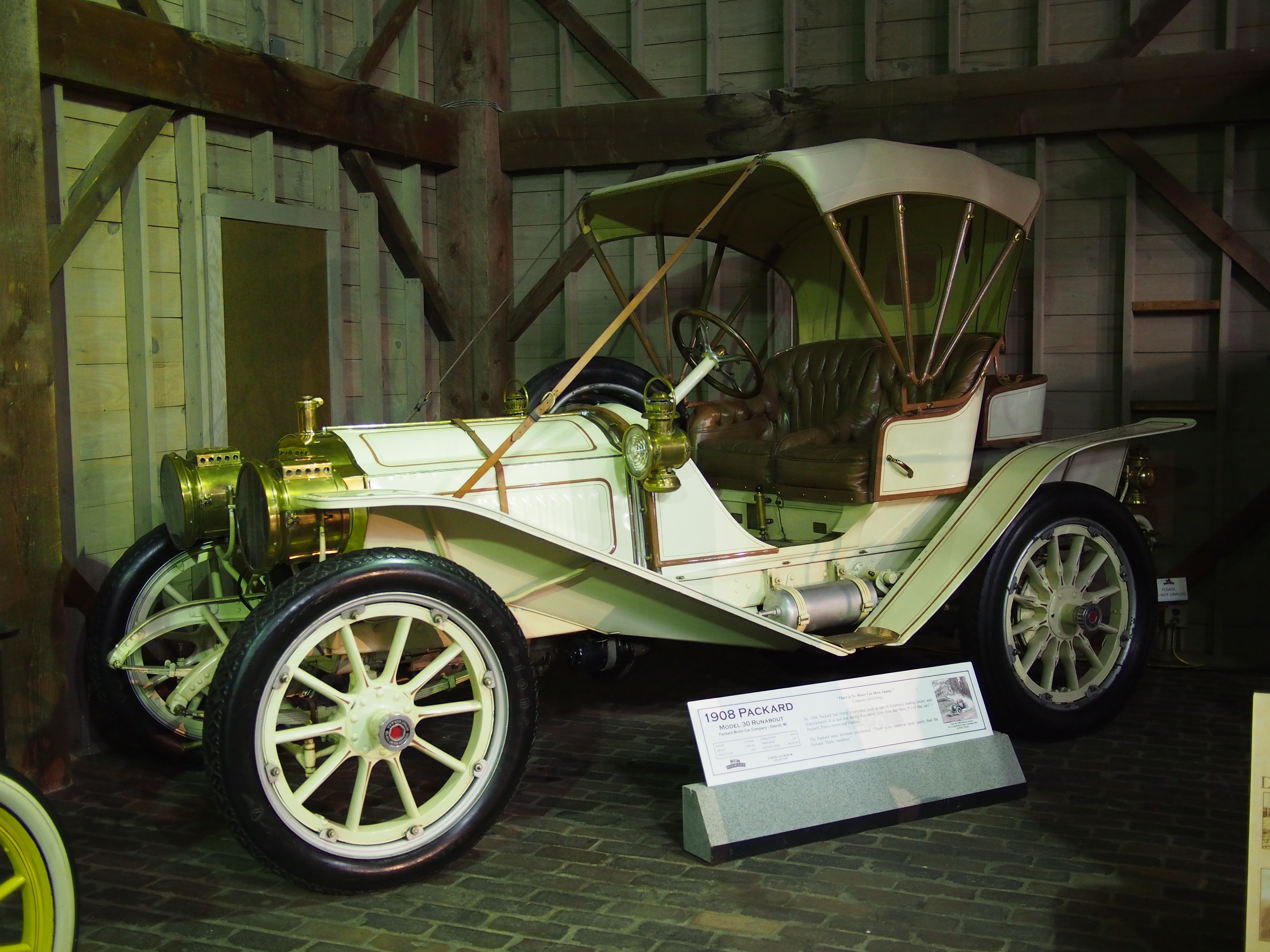
1908 Packard Model Thirty UA Roadster - Museum of the Horseless Carriage at Gilmore Car Museum in Hickory Corners, MI

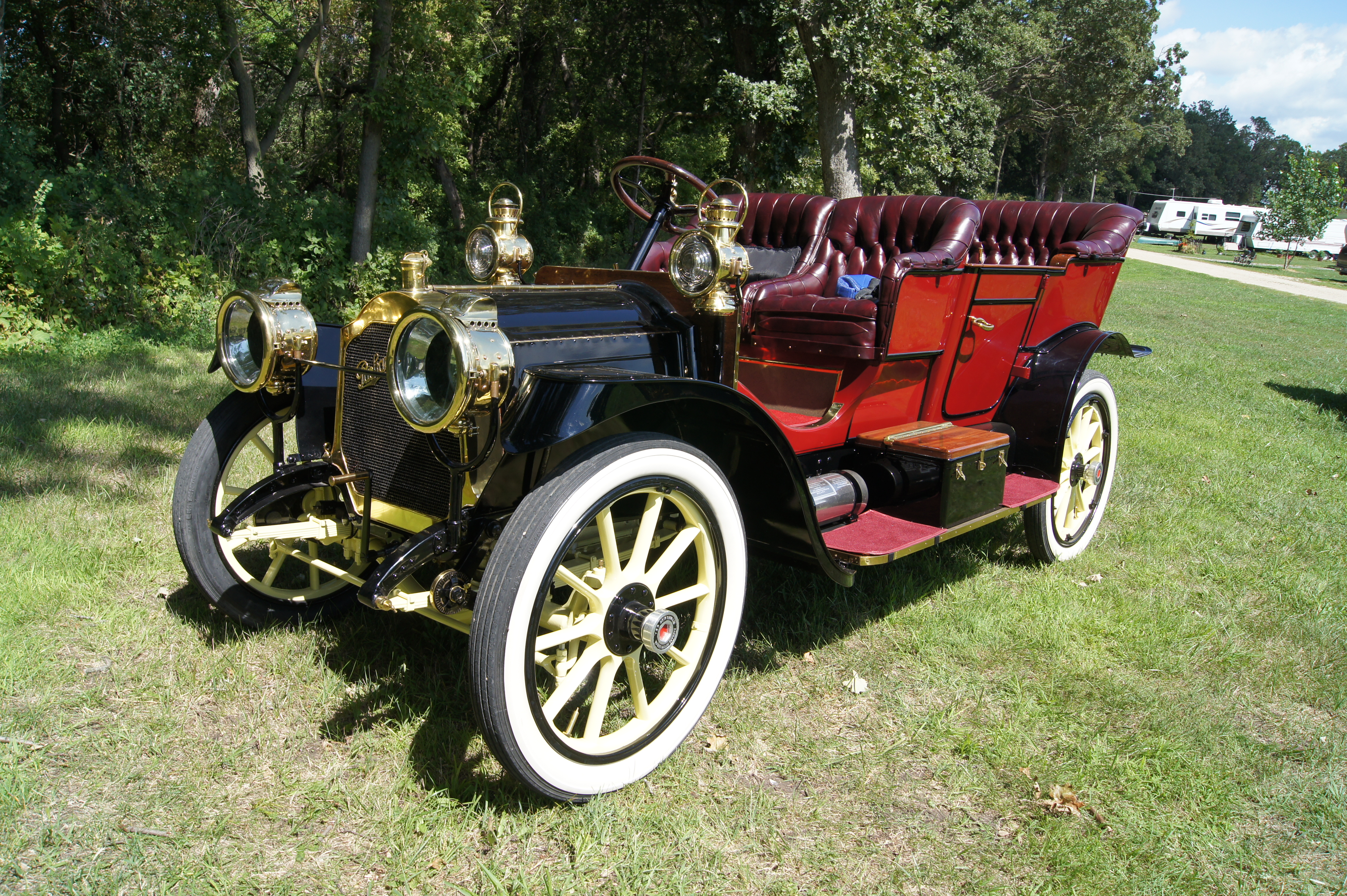
1910 Packard Eighteen Series NB

== Engine and drivetrain ==
A plate clutch was blocked with the engine. Power was transmitted by a long shaft with universal joints to the three-speed sliding-gear manual gearbox with reverse. This was located in a housing at the rear axle which also contained the differential. The car used shaft drive from the beginning, although many other high-powered cars at this time relied on double-chain drive.

In 1909, redesigned linkage in the transmission made it possible for the reverse gear to be activated with the regular gear-shift. Since 1904, all Packards had had a separate lever for the reverse gear.

== Chassis ==
The ladder-type frame used semielliptical leaf springs front and rear. Steering included now ball bearings instead of roller types, and featured a Pitman arm in front of the front axle.

Brakes were mechanical on the rear wheels only, working either by pedal (external contracting) or lever (internal expanding). Following the owner's manual, either was sufficient for stopping under normal conditions.
