= Piggins =

Defunct American motor vehicle manufacturer

Piggins Brothers
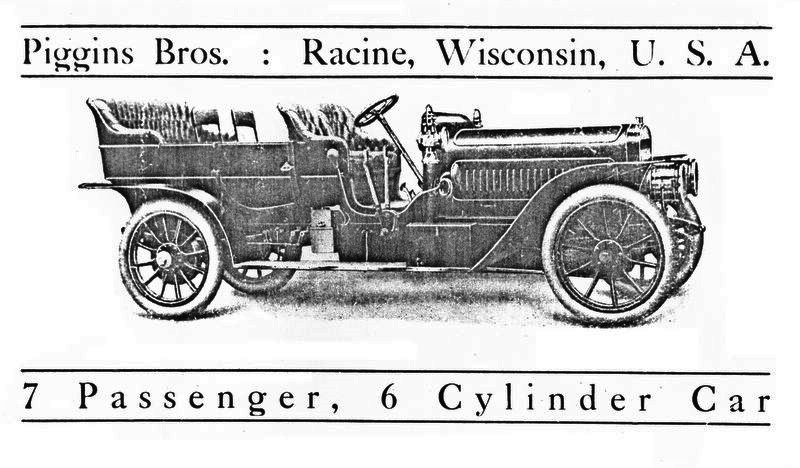
- The Name That Stands for Perfection in High Class Automobile Building
- Founded: circa 1883; 143 years ago
- Founder: Charles R. Piggins, Frederick H. Piggins
- Defunct: 1912; 114 years ago
- Fate: Merged
- Successor: Piggins Motor Truck Company
- Headquarters: Racine, Wisconsin, United States

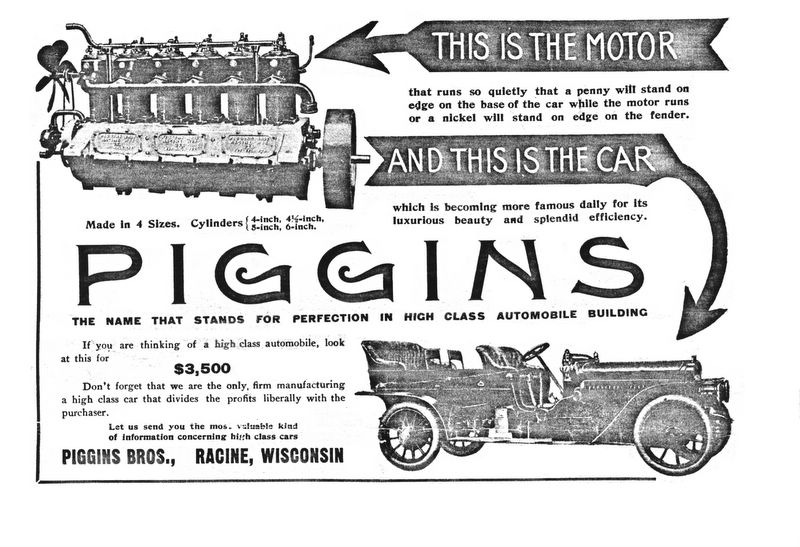
1909 Piggins 50-hp Touring Car - Motor Age Magazine

The Piggins was a brass era American luxury automobile manufactured in 1908 and 1909 in Racine, Wisconsin by the Piggins Brothers.

== History ==
Charles R. Piggins and his brother Frederick H. Piggins were machinists who built an experimental steam car in 1883, an electric car in 1897 and their first gasoline car in 1902. From 1902, the Piggins Brothers machine shop at 1113 Sixth Street was producing gasoline automobile engines, in addition to two-stroke marine engines.

The Piggins brothers claimed they had designed a gasoline motor that was smokeless and so noiseless that it could not be heard at a distance of six feet. In 1908 they entered automobile production with the biggest and most expensive car yet produced in Racine.

The Piggins was a T-head six-cylinder offered in two models for 1909, a 50-hp and a 36-hp. The 50-hp model was on a 135-inch wheelbase and fitted with a 7-passenger touring car body priced at $4,700, equivalent to $168,417 in 2025. The 36-hp touring car on a 117-inch wheelbase was priced at $3,500, equivalent to $125,417 in 2025. A few more cars may have been built into 1910, but total automobile production is not recorded.

Early in 1912 the Piggins Motor Truck Company was formed and a truck called "The Practical Piggins” was produced until 1916. Piggins was merged into Reliance Motor Truck Co., which was continued in manufacture in Racine and Appleton into the 1920's.
