= Packard Six =

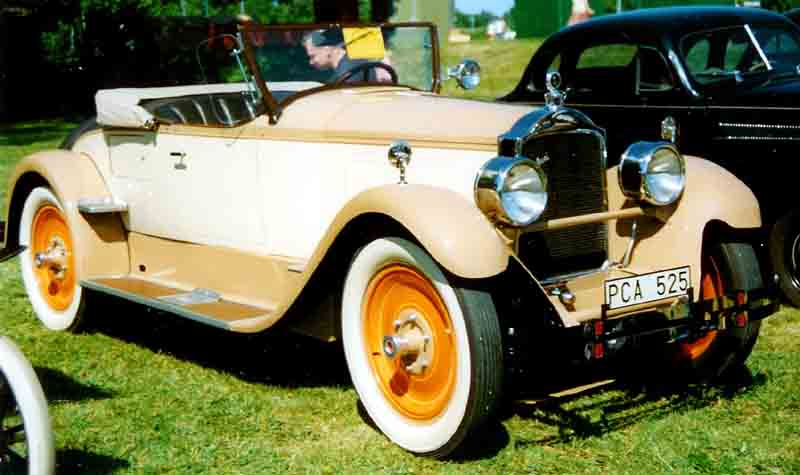
- 1927 Packard Fourth Series Six Model 426

Overview
- Manufacturer: Packard
- Production: 1913–1947
- Assembly: Packard Automotive Plant, Detroit, MI

Body and chassis
- Class: Luxury car
- Body style: •2-door roadster •2-door coupé •2-door convertible Victoria •4-door sedan •4-door phaeton •4-door dual-cowl phaeton & Sport Phaeton •town car •landau
- Layout: Front engine, rear drive

Chronology
- Predecessor: Packard Four
- Successor: Packard One-Ten

The Packard Six was a series of luxury automobiles built over several generations by Packard from 1913 until 1947. The name was originally used to describe the car in general terms, while Series numbers were initially used and changed every year to denote wheelbases, then the number classification changed as market conditions changed so as to keep competitive with other luxury brands.

There are three generations that used a six-cylinder engine before World War II, with varying engine displacements and periodic mechanical changes.

== First Generation (1912–1915) ==
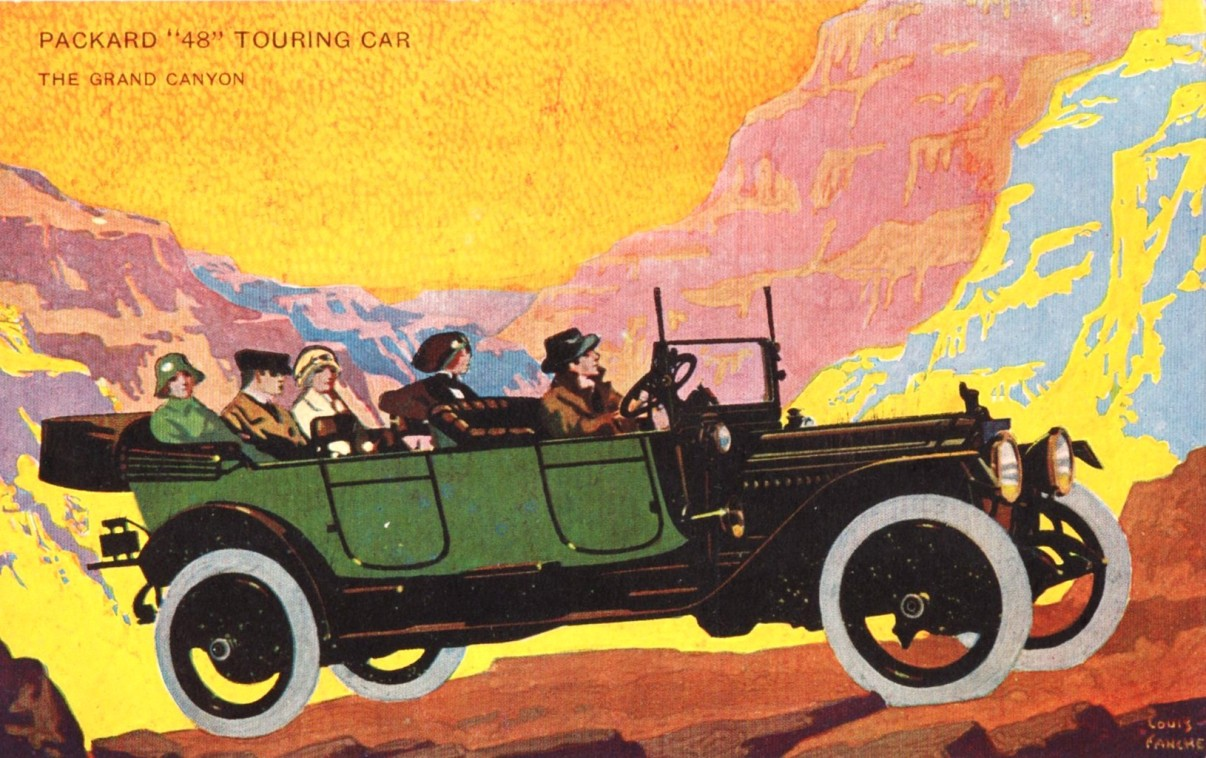
1914 Packard 3-48 Touring Sedan

The Packard Six was the first top level luxury platform built by the company to introduce a six-cylinder engine, and was offered in three wheelbase options of 121.5 in (3,086.1 mm), 133 in (3,378.2 mm), and 139 in (3,530.6 mm). This was the last Packard to use the term "model" in its designation. Officially, the car was first introduced as the Packard Six Series 1-48. The car was described with varying marketing terms such as the Packard Six, the Packard Dominant Six, the Packard 'Six-48', '1248', and the Packard '48'. The '48' designation was assigned to 525 cu in (8,603 cc) T-head engines, while the Series 1-38 or '38' designation was used for 415 cu in (6,801 cc) L-head engines that used a different valve configuration. The transmission offered three forward gears and was installed at the rear axle. The Six was replaced in 1916 with the Packard Twin Six and was the only platform manufactured in two wheelbases. Retail price of an Imperial Landaulet 7-passenger sedan was US$6,550 ($210,536 in 2025 dollars).

The line consisted of:

- 1912: 1-48 (3 wheelbase options)
- 1913: 1-38 (3 wheelbase options)
- 1913: 2-48 (3 wheelbase options)
- 1914: 1-38 (1 wheelbase only)
- 1914: 2-38 (1 wheelbase only)
- 1914: 3-48 (2 wheelbase options)
- 1914: 4-48 (1 wheelbase only)
- 1915: 3-38 (1 wheelbase only)
- 1915: 5-48 (1 wheelbase only)

1912-1915 Six "48": T-head, 525 c.i. (8.6L), 62-74 bhp. N.A.C.C./RAC rating 48 HP.
1913-1915 Six "38": side valve, 415 c.i. (6.8L), 60-65 bhp. N.A.C.C./RAC rating 38 HP.

== Second Generation (1921–1928) ==
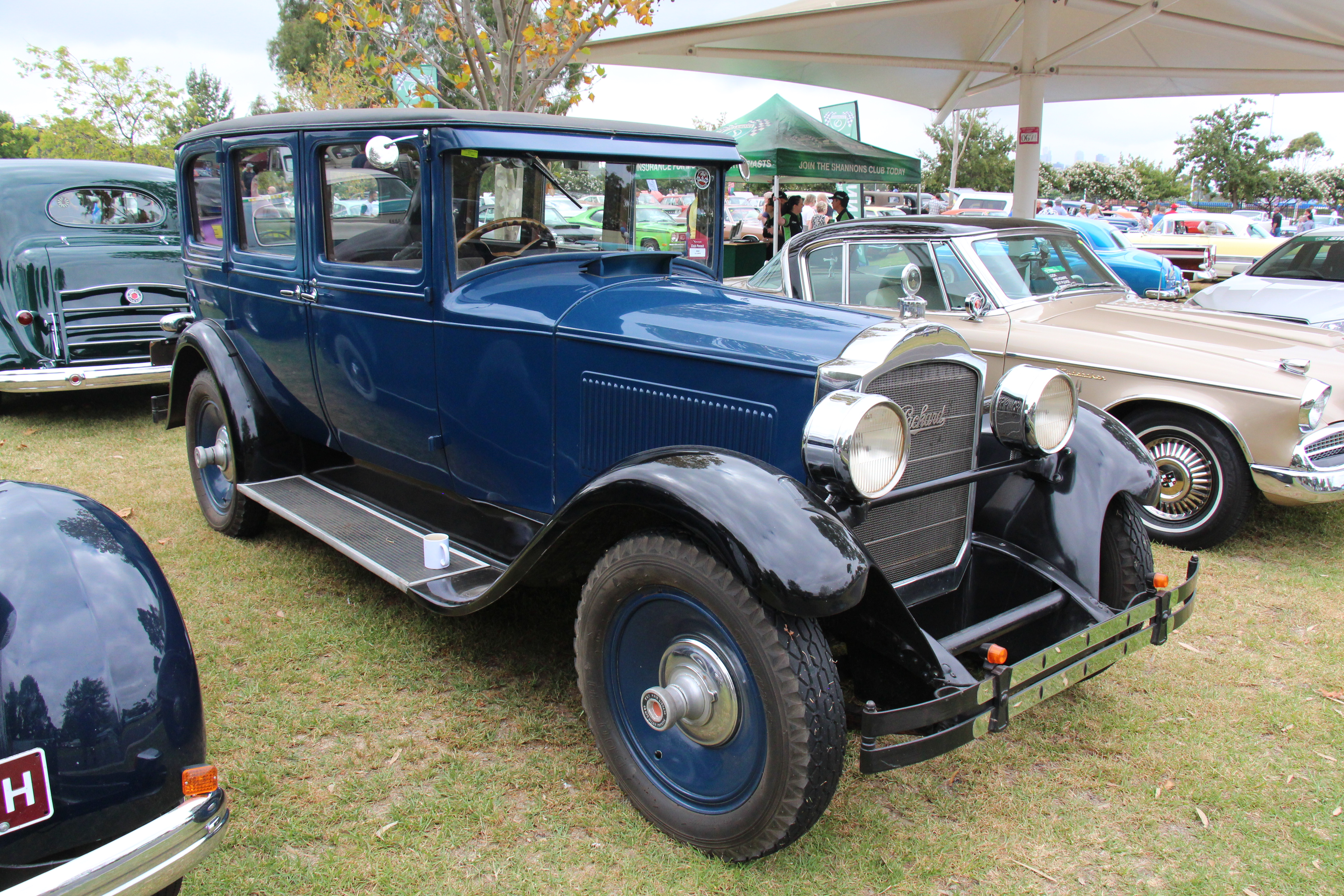
1926 Packard 4-33 Six Sedan

Beginning in 1921, the L-head engine was once again the only engine offered with a 116" wheelbase. It was officially identified as the Packard Single Six until it was joined with the Packard Single Eight in 1924. Once the eight cylinder engine was introduced, the Six was repositioned as a mid-level luxury car competing with the Buick Master Six and later the Chrysler Six, with a retail price of a 1921 5-passenger sedan listed at US$4,940 ($89,169 in 2025 dollars).

This generation introduced updated vehicle identification: 1st digit is series (Six only, Twin Sixes and Eights had their own series designation), 2nd and 3rd digits refer to wheelbase. F.e.: 233 is 2nd series Six, (longer) 133" wheelbase. 326 is 3rd series Six, (shorter) 126" wheelbase.
The line consisted of:

- 1st Series (Single Six)
  - series 116, 116 in. wheelbase (1921-1922). This model was also designated the Single Six.
  - series 126, 126 in. wheelbase (1922-1923). This model was also designated the Single Six.
  - series 133, 133 in. wheelbase (1922-1923). This model was also designated the Single Six.
- 2nd Series (Six)
  - series 226, 126 in. wheelbase
  - series 233, 133 in. wheelbase
- 3rd Series (Six)
  - series 326, 126 in. wheelbase
  - series 333, 133 in. wheelbase
- 4th Series (Six)
  - series 426, 126 in. wheelbase
  - series 433, 133 in. wheelbase
- 5th Series (Six)
  - series 526, 126 in. wheelbase
  - series 533, 133 in. wheelbase

The Six was discontinued after the 5th series, and there was no Packard six cylinder car until the 1937 115-C. As the complicated naming system was revised for 1929, 626 and 633 refer to the new 1929 Packard Standard Eight in a similar way. 5th series Eight was omitted.

== Third Generation (1937–1947) ==
Packard reintroduced the six cylinder model as the Packard Fifteenth Series Six Model 115-C, a lower priced companion to the One-Twenty. The first model year was 1937, introduced in September 1936. The first model year was named for its 115-inch (2,921 mm) wheelbase, and used a 236.7 cu in (3.9 L; 3,878 cc) L-head engine - the One-Twenty's V8 minus two cylinders. It was introduced as an affordable middle-class family car competing with the Oldsmobile L-Series and DeSoto sixes and the retail price for a 4-door sedan was US$895 ($20,044 in 2025 dollars) while the station wagon was listed at US$1,295 ($29,003 in 2025 dollars).

For 1938, the wheelbase was extended to 122 inches (3,099 mm), while the engine was bored out and now displaced 245.3 cu in (4.0 L; 4,020 cc). Power remained 100 hp (75 kW), but with increased torque. The bodystyles were also reshuffled, with somewhat fewer options overall. The name was now simply the Packard Six again. Built until 1942 with continuous annual improvements, it was renamed the Packard One-Ten beginning in 1940.

When production resumed after the war in the fall of 1945, the model year 1946 resumed with pre-war designs, and all models with the larger 245.3 cu in (4,020 cc) L-head engine were now called the Packard Clipper, with designations of Clipper Six. The listed retail price of the Clipper Series 2100 4-door Touring Sedan Model 1682 was US$1730 ($28,563 in 2025 dollars).

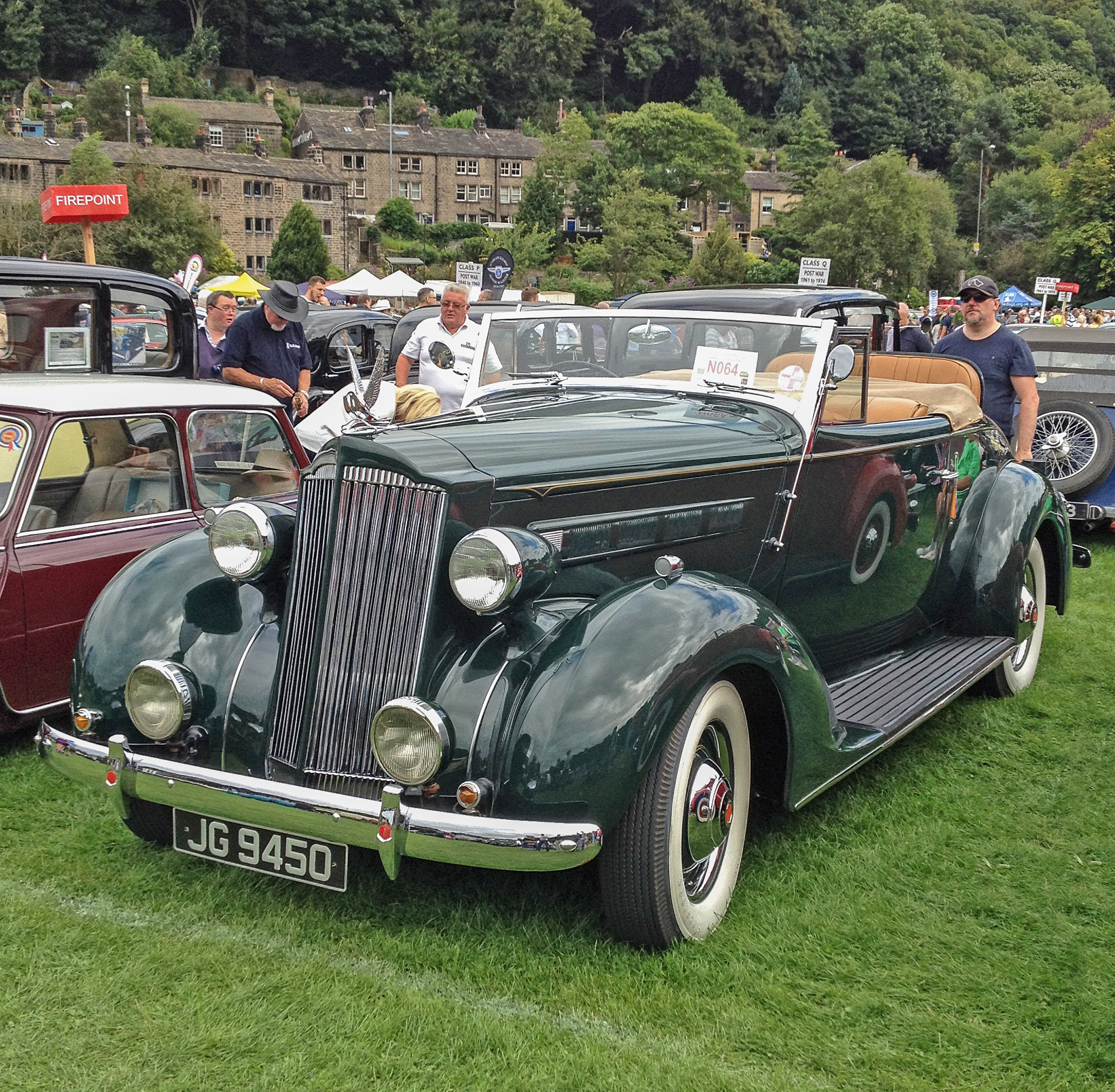
1937 Packard Six Series 115-C

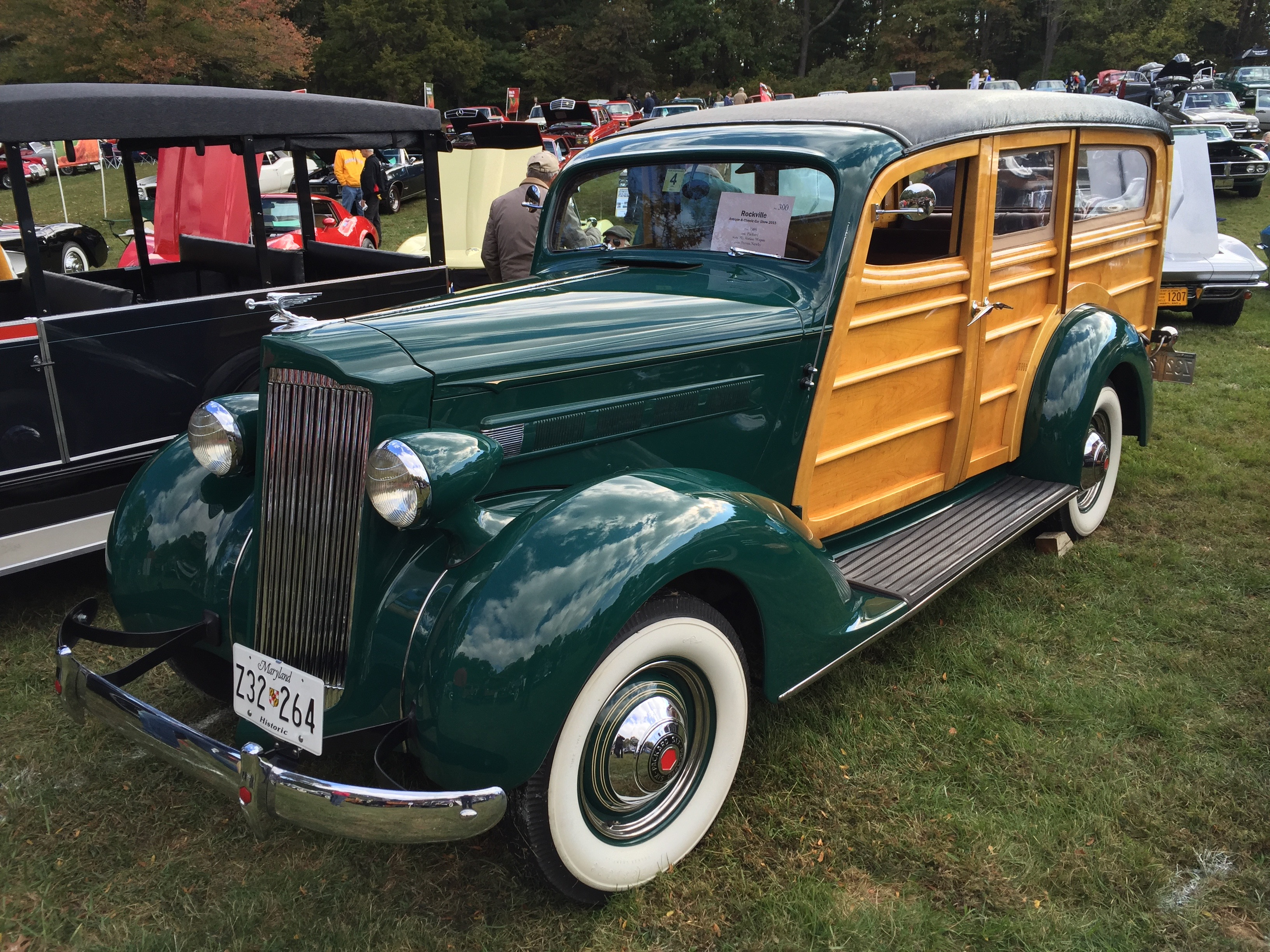
1937 Packard Six Series 115-C Station Wagon, body by Baker-Raulang

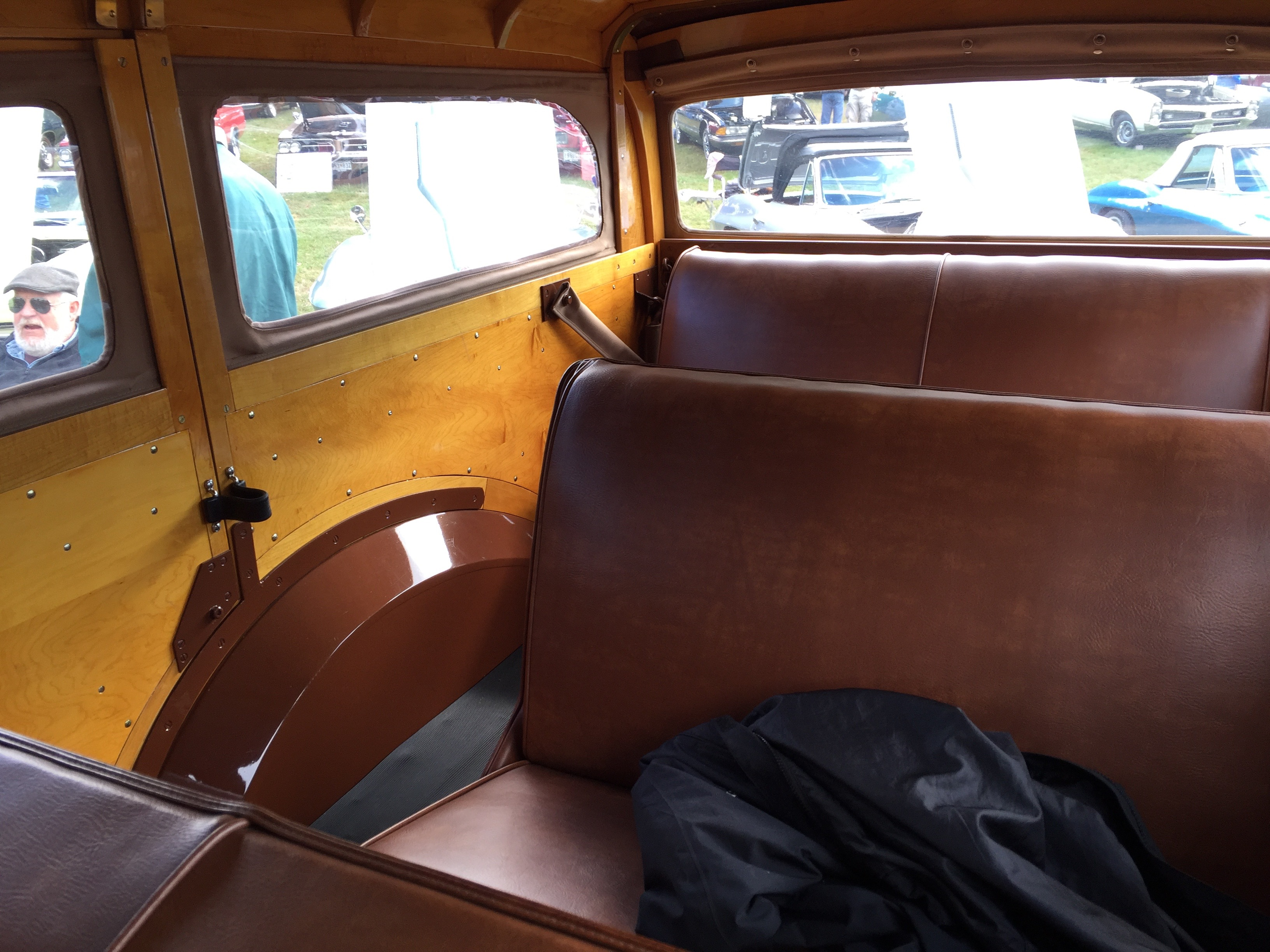
1937 Packard Six Series 115-C Station Wagon interior

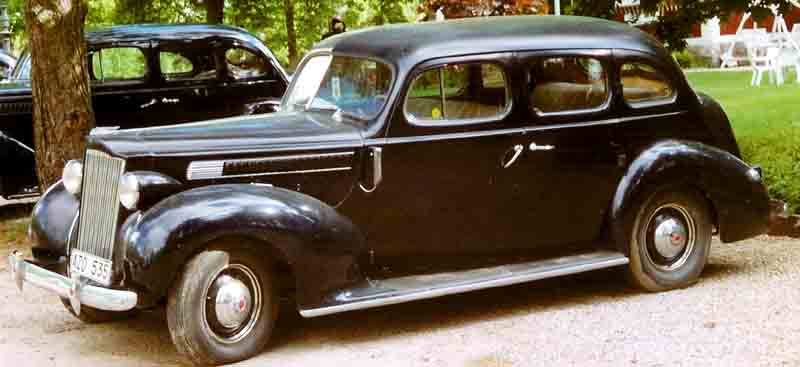
1939 Packard Six Series 1700 Model 1282 Touring Sedan

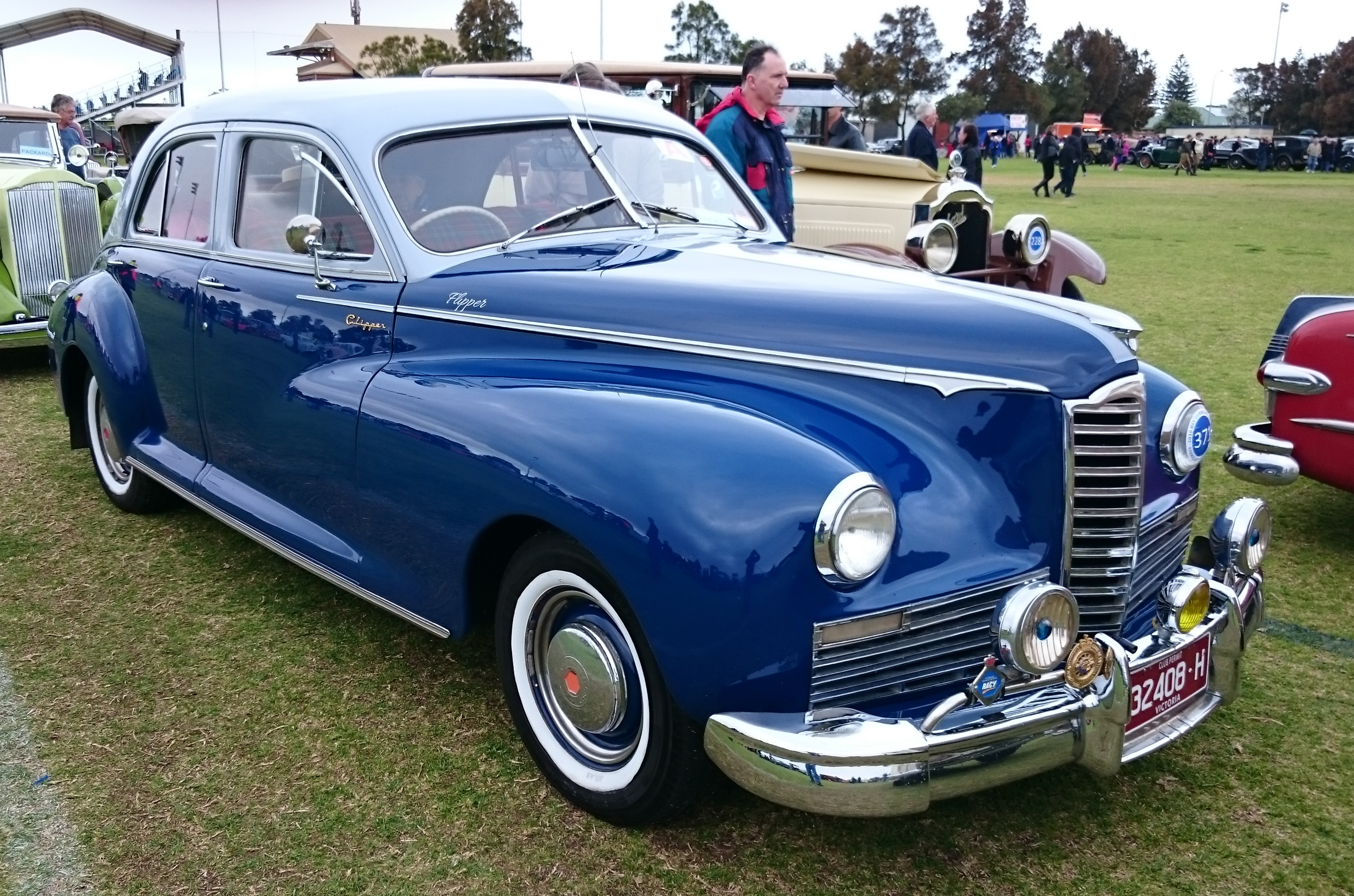
1946 Packard Clipper Six (1682)
