= Packard One-Ten =

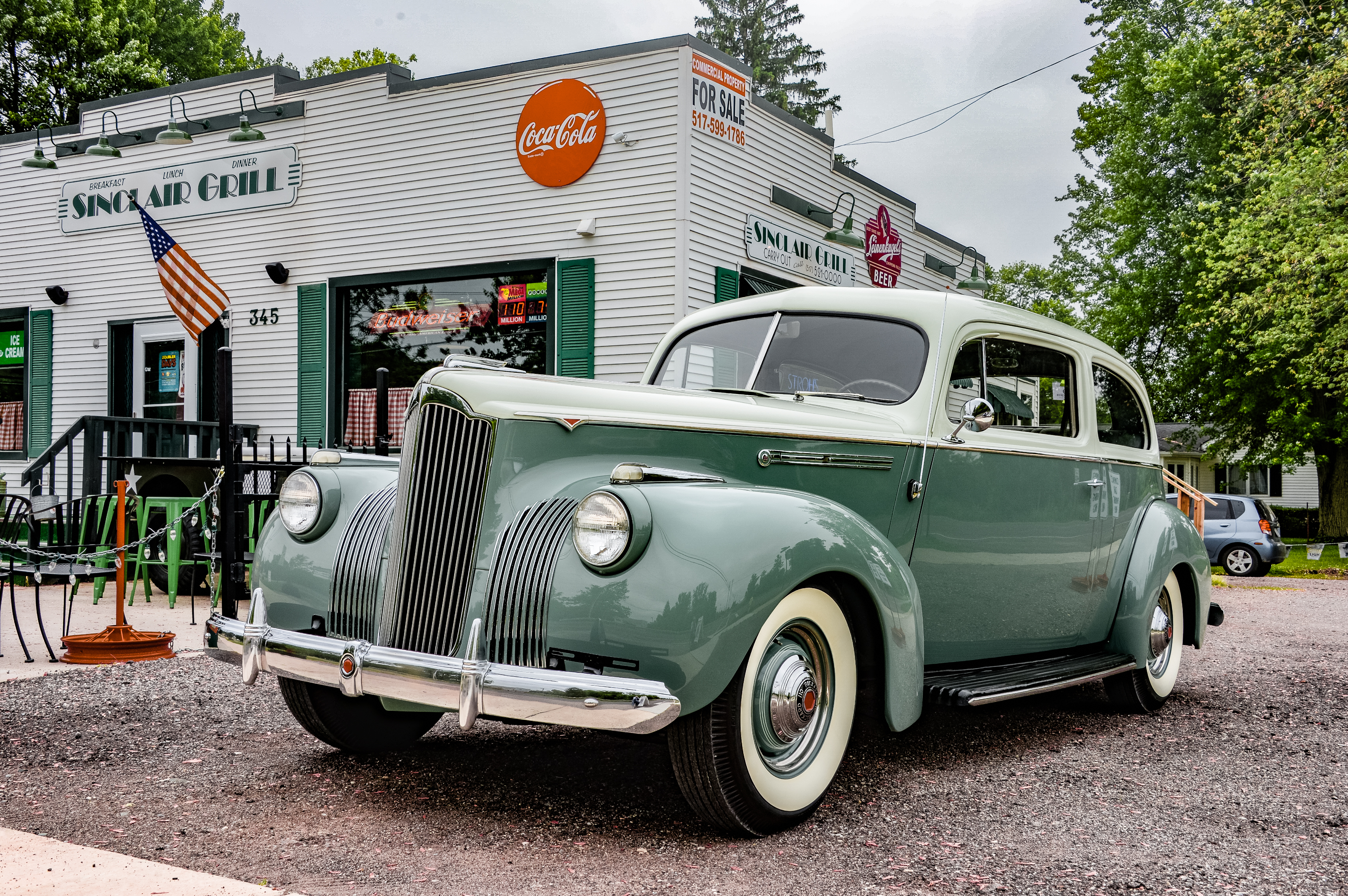
- 1941 Packard Eighteenth Series One-Ten Touring Sedan

Overview
- Model years: 1940–1941

Body and chassis
- Body style: 2-door coupé; 2-door convertible; 2-door sedan; 4-door sedan; 4-door station wagon
- Layout: Front-engine, rear-wheel-drive
- Related: Packard One-Twenty

Powertrain
- Engine: 245 cu in (4.0 L) I6 (1935)
- Transmission: 3-speed manual

Dimensions
- Wheelbase: 122 in (3,098.8 mm)
- Curb weight: 3,380 lb (1,530 kg)

The Packard Eighteenth Series One-Ten was a range of six-cylinder automobiles produced by the Packard Motor Car Company of Detroit, Michigan during the 1940 and 1941 model years. The One-Ten designation was renamed from the previous Packard Fifteenth Series Six (115-C). The One-Ten shared the wheelbase of the One-Twenty but was given the One-Ten designation to indicate it was the entry level product.

Packard reintroduced a line of six-cylinder cars in 1937 after a ten-year absence as a response to the economic depression and ongoing recovery cycle in the United States. As an independent automaker, Packard could not look to other internal divisions to support its luxury models, so the inclusion of the Six, and the later One-Ten, was necessary to aid in supporting the firm's bottom line until better times returned.

Critics of the Packard Six and One-Ten have long maintained they hurt Packard's reputation of being America's premier luxury marque. Still, the reintroduction of the Six could not have come at a better time for the automaker, just prior to the nation's 1938 economic depression. By offering the less expensive model, the company was able to attract buyers who would otherwise be unable to purchase more expensive cars. Prices ranged from US$867 ($19,459 in 2024 dollars) for the Business Coupe to US$1,200 ($26,933 in 2024 dollars) for the Station Wagon.

Built on a shorter wheelbase than the senior Packards, the One-Ten was introduced in August 1939. The One-Ten was available in a broad range of Body styles, including both two and four-door sedans, station wagon and convertible. Total output for the 1940 model year was 62,300 units.

Following its successful first year, the 1941 One-Ten model range was expanded, and a second trim level, the Deluxe was added. Packard also added a taxi line within the One-Ten model range. Options for the One-Ten included heater, radio, spotlight, and despite its low-line status, air conditioning.

For 1942, Packard made a decision to retain numerical designated models within its senior line and the One-Ten reverted to being called Packard Six.
