= Vespa PK =

Range of motorcycle scooters by Piaggio

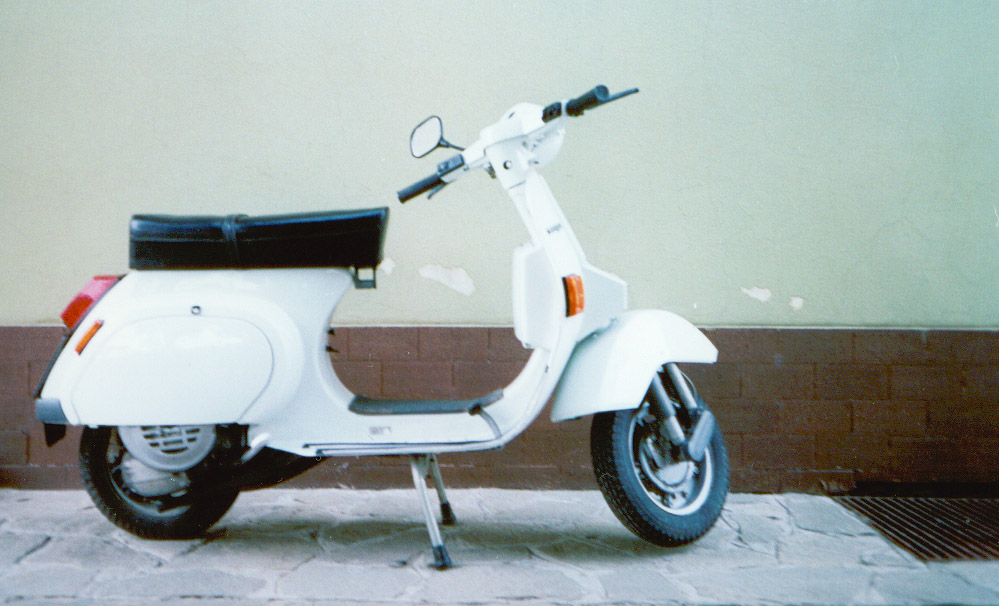
Vespa PK 125S

The Vespa PK Series is a range of scooters manufactured by Piaggio under the Vespa brand.

== History ==
The Vespa PK was first presented in 1982 at Intermot Cologne as the replacement for the 50 and primavera line models that had been in production since the late 1960s. The PK range of models continued production till 1996. It was built with two drum brakes, a single-cylinder air cooled engine, electronic ignition and a steel chassis,It was originally distributed as Vespa PK50, PK S 50, PK125 and PK125S. For export outside Italy PK80 and PK100 versions were also produced.

A Sporting version of the 125 PK the PK125 ETS was displayed at the 1983 EICMA show in Milan.

In 1983 the first Vespa with automatic transmission, the 125 PK S Automatica was displayed at the 1983 EICMA show in Milan.In 1984 at Intermot Cologne show a 50cc version was presented -For export outside Italy PK80 Automatica and PK100 Automatica versions were also produced.

At EICMA in 1985 for 1986 a restyle for the original PK followed as the PK50 XL and XLS , PK125 XL and XLS and 50 XL Plurimatic models were presented. A 125cc version of the plurimatic followed in 1987.

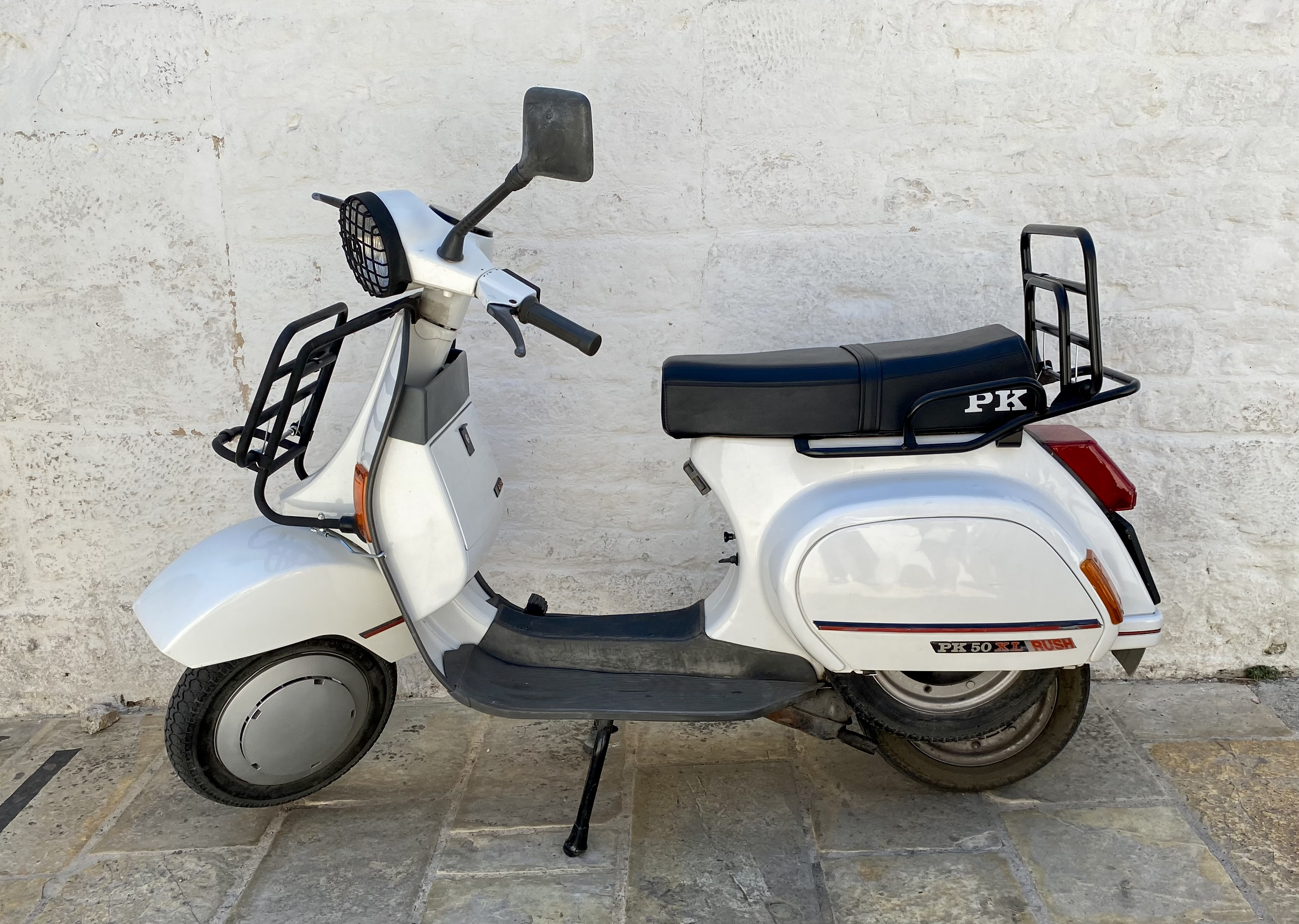
Vespa PK 50 XL Rush

To take advantage of new Italian traffic regulations the rated power of the PK 50 XL Rush was increased to 2.3 hp. This was introduces in 1987 at Eicma

For the new decade a third restyle of the PK was introduced as the Vespa PK50N and PK50N Speedmatic

In 1992 the final versions of the line were introduced as the FL2 (face lift) .

== Comparison of Various PK Models ==
| | PK 50 | PK 50S | PK 50S Automatica | PK 80 | PK 100 | PK 125 | PK 125S | PK 125S Automatica | PK 125 ETS | PK 50 XL/XLS | PK 50 XL Plurimatic | PK 50 XLS Plurimatic | PK 125 XL/XLS | PK 125 XL Plurimatic | PK 50 Rush | PK 50 N | PK 50 N Speedmatic | PK 50 FL2 | PK 50 FL2 Speedmatic | PK 125 FL2 | PK 125 FL2 Plurimatic |
|---|---|---|---|---|---|---|---|---|---|---|---|---|---|---|---|---|---|---|---|---|---|
| Years in Production | 1982–1986 | 1982–1986 | 1984–1986 | 1982- | | 1982–1986 | 1982–1986 | 1983–1986 | 1984–1985 | 1986–1989 | 1986–1989 | 1986–1989 | 1986–1990 | 1987–1990 | 1988–1990 | 1989–1991 | 1989–1991 | 1992–1996 | 1992–1996 | 1991–1996 | 1991–1996 |
| Prefix | V5X1T | V5X2T | VAS1T | V8X5T | V9X2T | VMX1T | VMX5T | VAZM1T | VMS1T | V5X3T | VA52T | VA53T | VMX6T | VVM1T | V5X4T | V5X5T | V5P1T | V5X5T | V5P1T | VMX7T | VMX7T |
| Engine Type | Air-cooled, single-cylinder, two-stroke engine | | | | | | | | | | | | | | | | | | | | |
| Bore x Stroke (mm) | 38,4 × 43 | 38,4 × 43 | 38,4 × 43 | 44,5 × 51 | 49 × 51 | 55 × 51 | 55 × 51 | 55 × 51 | 55 × 51 | 38,4 × 43 | 38,4 × 43 | 38,4 × 43 | 55 × 51 | 55 × 51 | 38,4 × 43 | 38,4 × 43 | 38,4 × 43 | 38,4 × 43 | 38,4 × 43 | 55 × 51 | 55 × 51 |
| Engine Capacity | 49,79 cm^{3} | 49,79 cm^{3} | 49,79 cm^{3} | 79 cm^{3} | 96,2 cm^{3} | 121,1 cm^{3} | 121,1 cm^{3} | 121,1 cm^{3} | 121,1 cm^{3} | 49,79 cm^{3} | 49,79 cm^{3} | 49,79 cm^{3} | 121,1 cm^{3} | 121,1 cm^{3} | 49,79 cm^{3} | 49,79 cm^{3} | 49,79 cm^{3} | 49,79 cm^{3} | 49,79 cm^{3} | 121,1 cm^{3} | 121,1 cm^{3} |
| Power in kW (BHP) | 1.5HP@ 4500/min | 1.5HP@ 4500/min | 1.5HP@ 4500/min | 5.4HP@ 6000/min | 3,9 kW (5,3 PS) | 6.8HP@ 5600/min | 6.8HP@ 5600/min | 7.5HP@ 6200/min | 8.5HP@ 6200/min | 2HP@ 5500/min | 2HP@ 5500/min | 2HP@ 5500/min | 6.8HP@ 5600/min | 6.8HP@ 5600/min | 2.3HP@ 4500/min | 2.2HP@ 5000/min | 2.5HP@ 6250/min | 2.5HP@ 6250/min | 2.5HP@ 6250/min | 8.2HP@ 6200/min | 8.2HP@ 6200/min |
| Transmission | Four-speed manual, grip shift | | Automatic | Four-speed manual, grip shift | | | | Automatic | Four-speed manual, grip shift | | Automatic | | Four-speed manual, grip shift | Automatic | Four-speed manual, grip shift | | Automatic | Four-speed manual, grip shift | Automatic | Four-speed manual, grip shift | Automatic |
| Top Speed | 40 km/h | 40 km/h | 40 km/h | 77 km/h | | 86 km/h | 90 km/h | 90 km/h | 97 km/h | 50 km/h | 50 km/h | 50 km/h | 90 km/h | 90 km/h | 40 km/h | 40 km/h | 40 km/h | 40 km/h | 40 km/h | 100 km/h | 100 km/h |
| Colours | White, Red, Blue, Green | White, Red, Blue, Green | White, Red, Blue | | | White, Red, Green | White, Red, Green | Blue, Grey | Red, Grey/black stripes | White, Red, Blue, Green | White, Red, Blue | White, Red, Blue | Red, Grey/black stripes | White, Red | White, Red | White, Green | White, Green | White | White | White | White |
| Production Total | 16,411 | 220,477 | 2,121 | | | 7,278 | 61,505 | 10,024 | 11,711 | 192,418 | 4,989 | 1,670 | 53,750 | | 61,069 | 43,478 | 4,924 | | | | |
