= Packard Single-Cylinder =

American car series

The Packard Single-Cylinder cars are a group of cars made by the Packard automobile company from 1899 to 1903 in Warren, Ohio. The four cylinder Model K was introduced in 1903.

== Models ==
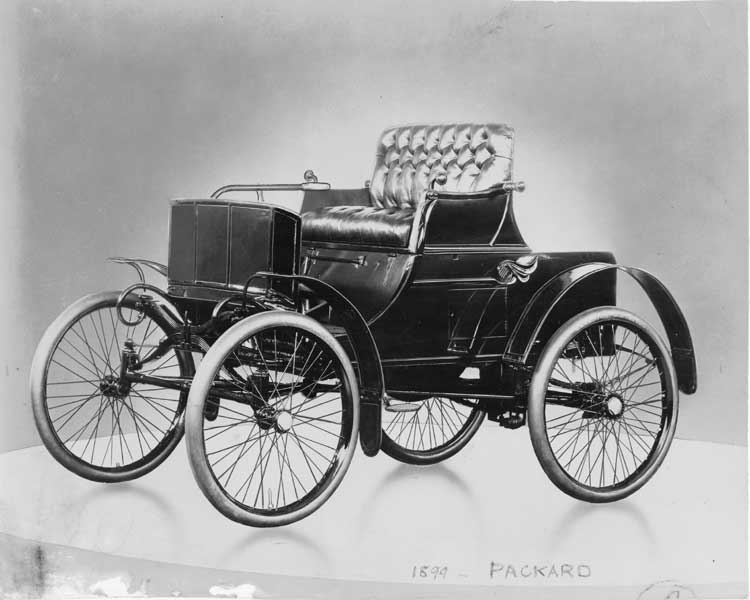
Model A Packard

Model A(1899): The Model A was the first automobile produced by the Packard Motor Company. Only five were made. The last one produced was also the first Packard sold, to a Warren, Ohio, business man named George Kirkham.

| Model | Engine | HP | Transmission | Wheelbase |
|---|---|---|---|---|
| A | 142.6CID cast-iron block one-cylinder | 9 | 2-speed planetary | 71.5" |

Model B(1900–1901): The Model B was the second model produced by Packard. Steering was still by a lever, but a foot pedal was now used for speed control rather than a lever like in the Model A.

| Model | Engine | HP | Transmission | Wheelbase |
|---|---|---|---|---|
| B | 142.6CID cast iron block one cylinder | 9 | 2-speed planetary | 76" |

Model C(1901): The Model C was the third model produced by Packard. It was one step up from the Model B with a more powerful engine. It was also the first Packard to use a steering wheel instead of a tiller. Top speed was 25 mph (40 km/h).

| Model | Engine | HP | Transmission | Wheelbase |
|---|---|---|---|---|
| C | 183.8CID cast iron block one cylinder. | 12 | 2-speed planetary | 76" |

Model F (1901–1903): The Packard Model F was the last single-cylinder car made by the Packard Motor Company. It had some major advances, including a new 3-speed transmission. When it competed in an economy contest, the Model F averaged 27.5 mpg_{‑US} (8.6 L/100 km; 33.0 mpg_{‑imp}) mpg. It was the most expensive Packard till then, costing $2,500 in 1902(the price was lowered to $2,300 in 1903). It was replaced by the Model G.

| Model | Engine | HP | Transmission | Wheelbase |
|---|---|---|---|---|
| F | 183.8CID cast iron block one cylinder. | 12 | 3-speed sliding gear | 84" |
