= Packard Model G =

Packard Model G is a two cylinder car built in 1902 by the former American automobile manufacturer Ohio Automobile Company that changed its name to Packard Motor Car Company in October 1902.

At that time the company was located in Warren, Ohio; owners were brothers James Ward Packard and William Doud Packard and investor George Lewis Weiss. Model G was a development of the former single-cylinder cars the company had built since 1899 of which the last, Model F, was offered alongside the Model G. Introduction was in late summer 1902. Only four cars were built.

== Chassis ==
The pressed steel frame of the Model G was new although it followed earlier principles. With a wheelbase of 91 in. (2,311 mm) it was the longest yet. Track was 56 in. (1,422 mm), in fact 0.5 in. (12.7 mm) less than Model F's. The car had the then-usual right hand steering. It was among the first US automobiles that featured a steering wheel instead of a tiller.

Road wheels were non-detachable and of the artillery wheel type. Each had 14 wood spokes. Front and rear wheels had the same dimensions with 36 x 4.5 in. pneumatic tires. Model G had very big wheels hubs which gave the car a characteristic look. Suspension consisted of a semi-elliptical leaf springs in front and elliptical at the rear. There were two brakes; one actuated the transmission by a lever outside of the bodywork that actuated, the other, operated by pedal, the differential.

== Engine and Transmission ==
As with all Packards to date, the Model G's engine was placed under the driver's bench and laterally mounted, the crank protruding out of the right side. As mentioned, it was derived from the single-cylinder variant for which Packard already had a good reputation. Construction consisted of two single-cylinder engines that were connected in a horizontal opposed position and worked on a common crank shaft. Blocks were cast iron with non-detachable cylinder heads. Cylinders had a bore and stroke of 6 x 6 1/2 in. (152.4 × 165.1 mm) each, resulting in a displacement of 184 c.i (3,015 cm^{3}) per cylinder and huge 368 c.i. (6,030 cm^{3}) for the whole engine. Packard used a Longuemar float-feed carburetor for each cylinder. Ignition advance was manual. Power rating (following then-actual practice) was 24 H.P.

As introduced with the Model F, Model G also adopted a front-mounted, tough bigger, radiator. This led the car appear, together with the storage place behind it, as a front-engined automobile.

Gearbox was sliding gear, with three speeds forward plus reverse. Power transmission to the rear wheels worked via a single, center mounted chain which itself was connected to the differential.

== Coachwork ==
Model G was a huge car for the time, weighing in at about 4,000 pounds (1,800 kg). Packard offered it with two body styles: Either as a four-passenger Surrey or an eight-passenger Tonneau (sometimes called a "Rear Tonneau Roadster"). The surrey had neither front nor rear doors and came with two forward-facing benches. The tonneau had one bench in front plus two more placed longitudally. Access to the ladder was by a small door in the rear. There were no front doors. Coachwork was made of high quality using wood, probably by a local carriage builder as with other Packards. The customer had a free choice of colors. Upholstery was of qual quality, executed with top grain leather.

Included with the base price were a pair of Dietz oil lamps, a Speed-O-Meter, and gauges for fuel and oil, each installed on the respective tank. An ignition switch was optional. The actual MSRP is not known but considering the smaller Model F tonneau being priced at $2,500 it is a close guess that the more complex Model G cost over $3,000.

== Appreciation ==
While in 1902 alone, 179 Packard Model F left the plant in Warren, only 4 Model G were built. It marked a high- and terminal point for the Ohio Automobile Co. in many ways. It was the last Packard vastly developed by chief engineer and vice president William A. Hatcher who left the company January 17, 1903 because he did not agree with the direction the company took. His successor, Frenchman Charles Schmidt lead Packard to more modern, European construction principles.

Technically, Model G represents the end of the first generation Packards as it was the make's last buggy-styled passenger car (with the engine positioned under the driver's bench), the last with the noisy and not very reliable chain drive and, most important, the last with less than four cylinders. For a long time, J. W. Packard had been convinced that the single-cylinder engine was the power plant of the future. When it became obvious that the industry would lead another way, Packard followed suit with four-cylinder automobiles already in 1903. Thus, Model G remained the only passenger car with a twin (there also were some two-cylinder trucks), survived by the Model F by another year.

One of the customers who bought a Model G was William Rockefeller, younger brother of John D. Rockefeller. Of the four Model G's built, one still exists in a private collection. It is a surrey with a canopy and painted red.
