= T-head engine =

Type of early internal combustion engine

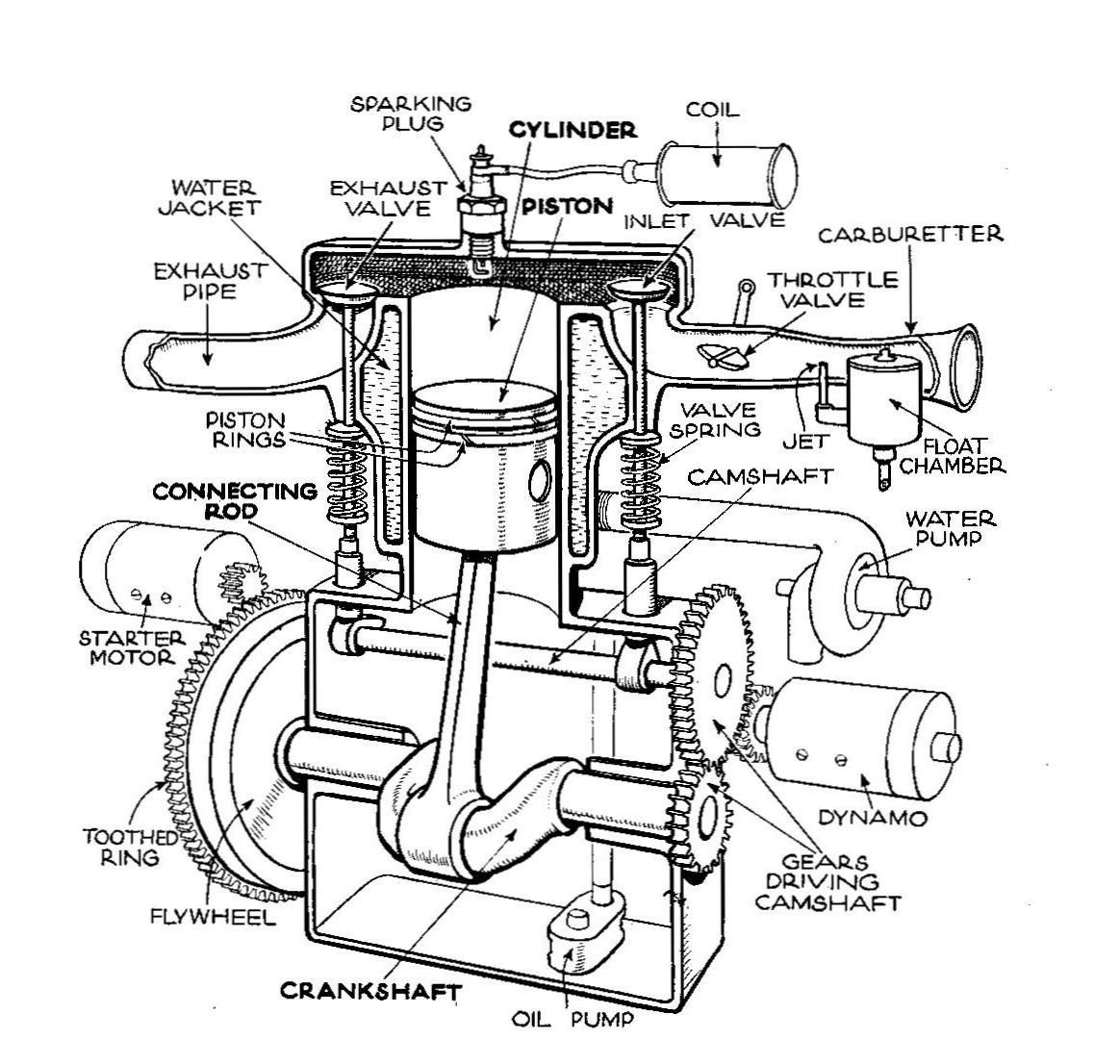
Schematic single-cylinder T-head engine

A T-head engine is an early type of internal combustion engine that became obsolete after World War I. It is a sidevalve engine distinguished from the more common L-head by its valve placement. In T-head engines, the intake valves are located on one side of the engine block and the exhaust valves on the other. When viewed from the end of the crankshaft, especially in a cutaway view, the cylinder and combustion chamber resemble a 'T', leading to the name "T-head". In contrast, an L-head engine has all valves on the same side.

== Overview ==
The T-head engine was an early form of crossflow cylinder head. It was relatively complex for its time, requiring separate camshafts for the intake and exhaust valves. T-heads were typically intricate castings, necessitating blind bores for the cylinders and valve chambers. This complexity made T-head engines more expensive to produce compared to the simpler L-head (flathead) engines. Moreover, T-head engines were heavy and inefficient for their displacement, producing less horsepower than a flathead or modern overhead valve engine of comparable size.

One reason for the T-head design's popularity from the late 19th century to the 1920s was the type of gasoline available then, which ignited at lower temperatures than contemporary fuels. If gasoline vapor became too hot or was overly compressed, it risked pre-ignition or detonation before the spark plug could ignite it. Detonation, a leading cause of catastrophic engine failure, necessitated managing both the temperature and compression of the highly volatile gasoline vapor for maximum reliability.

The T-head addressed these issues by placing the valves in open alcoves on opposite sides of the cylinder head. Additionally, cool water from the radiator was directed over the intake valves as a further safety measure. This design minimized heat transfer from the exhaust ports and reduced the engine's compression ratio, thereby preventing detonation. The relative inefficiency of the T-head engine was offset by significant reliability gains and suited the lower travel and racing speeds of the era. With the entire cylinder bore and cooling passages often contained within the head, many T-head engines required no head gasket and fewer gaskets overall, reducing potential leakage. This reliability made T-head engines popular in early auto racing, where engine reliability was more crucial than peak performance. However, as other engine designs enhanced their reliability during World War I, the T-head's performance limitations led to its decline in racing applications.

== Obsolescence ==
The T-head engine became obsolete in passenger cars due to advancements made during World War I and the introduction of anti-knock compounds like tetraethyl lead in the early 1920s. These developments made flathead L-head engines equally reliable, while also being more powerful, lighter, more fuel-efficient, and cheaper to manufacture. Despite this, T-heads remained in use in heavy equipment, large trucks, and fire trucks, being phased out of production only in the 1950s.

== Examples ==
This engine type was found on cars like Mercedes and Stutz and the last T-head engine in production for personal cars was manufactured by an American company, Locomobile. Stutz and White Motor Car Company both used four valve engines in 1917, developing 65 and 72 horse power respectively. The White Company engine was a mono block design. The Pierce-Arrow company introduced a production four-valve per cylinder T-head motor (Dual Valve Six) in 1918, one of the few, perhaps the only, multi-valve valve-in-block type engines produced. American LaFrance produced T-head engines for their fire engines until the 1950s.
