= Hudson Rambler =

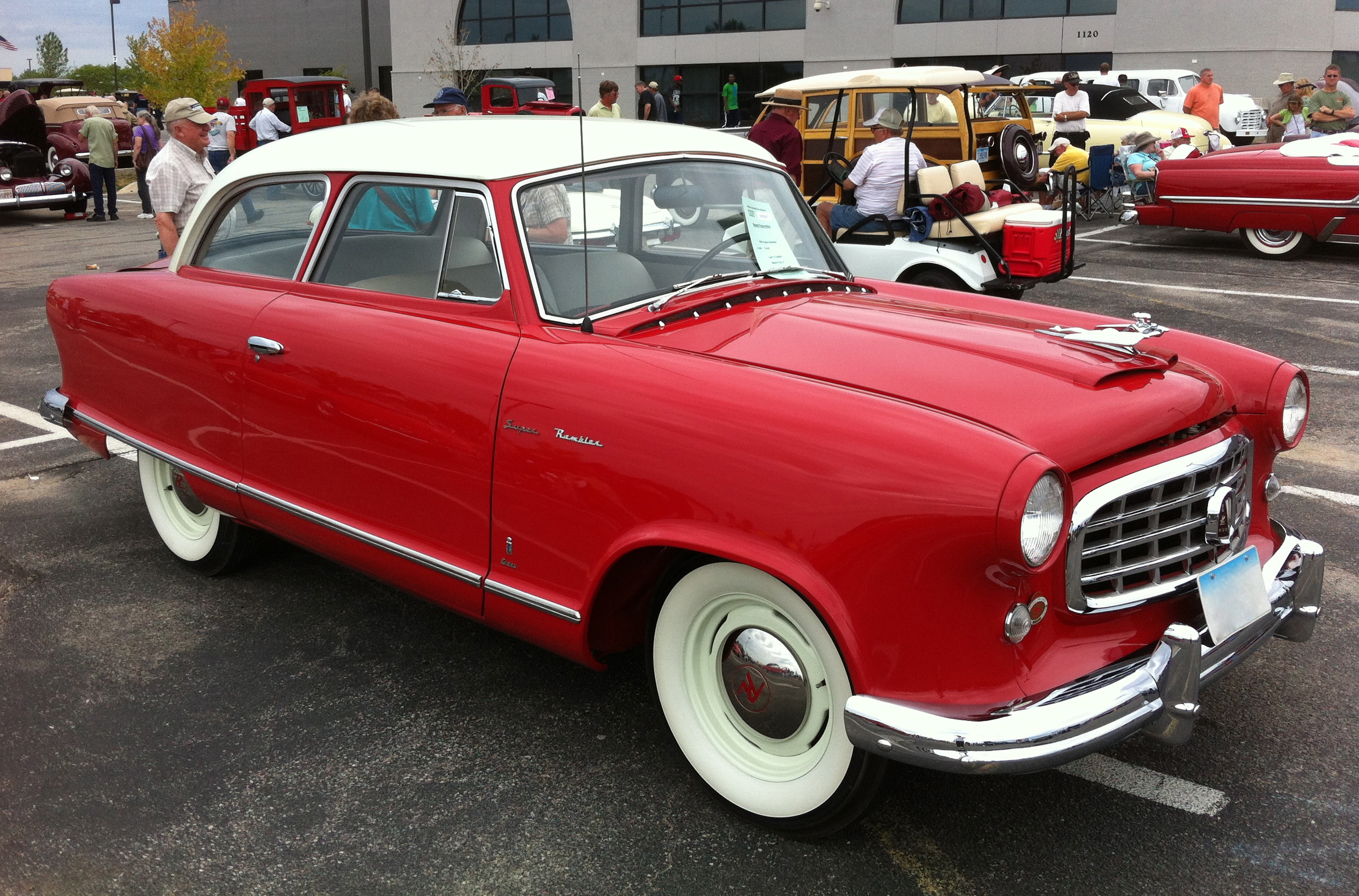
1955 Hudson Rambler

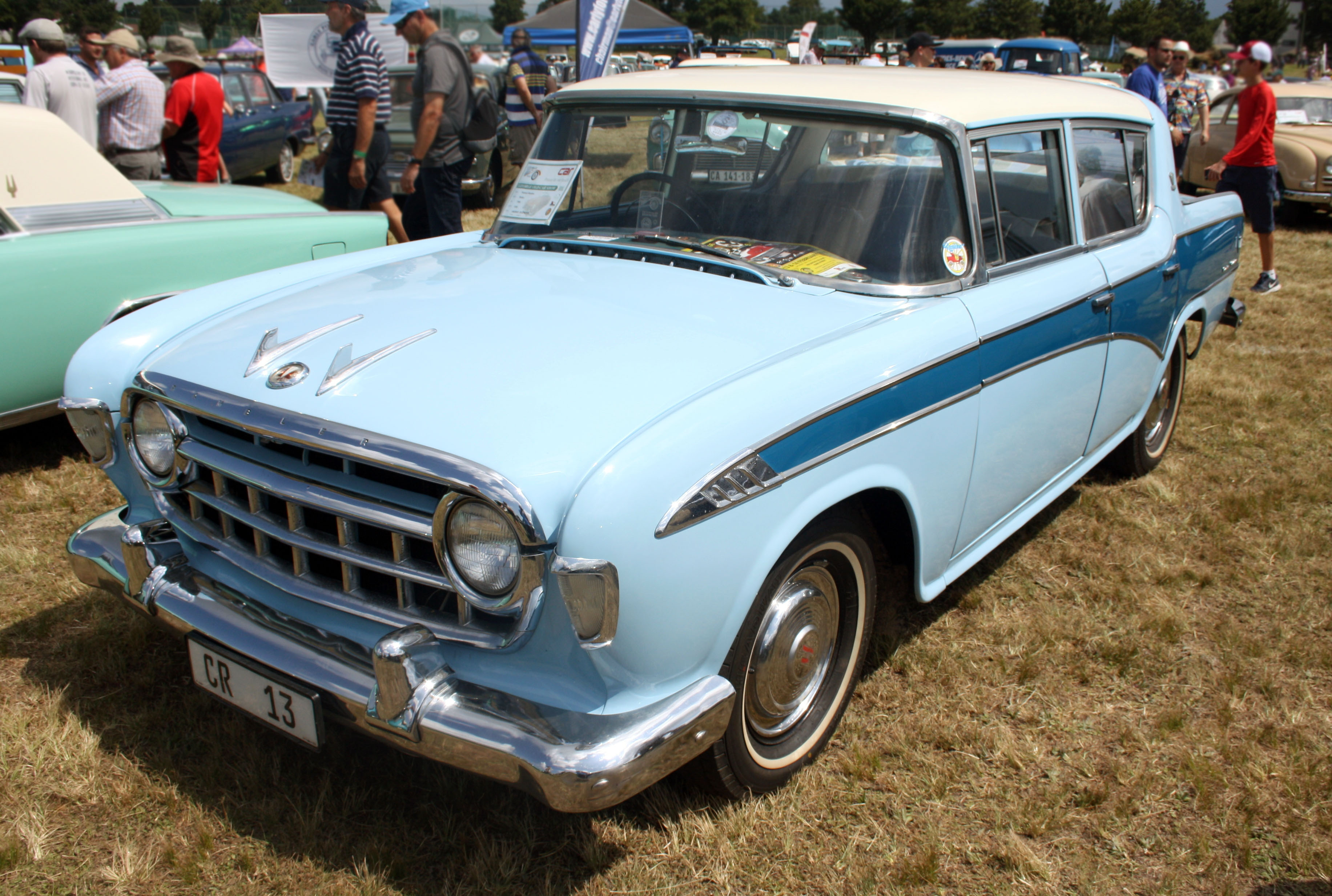
1956 Hudson Rambler

Hudson Rambler is an automobile nameplate applied to two distinct vehicles:

- Small-sized car also marketed as the Nash Rambler (introduced as a Hudson in 1955)
- Large-sized car also marketed as the Rambler Six and V8 (introduced as a Hudson in 1956)
