= Hudson Jet =

Compact car produced by Hudson Motor Car Company

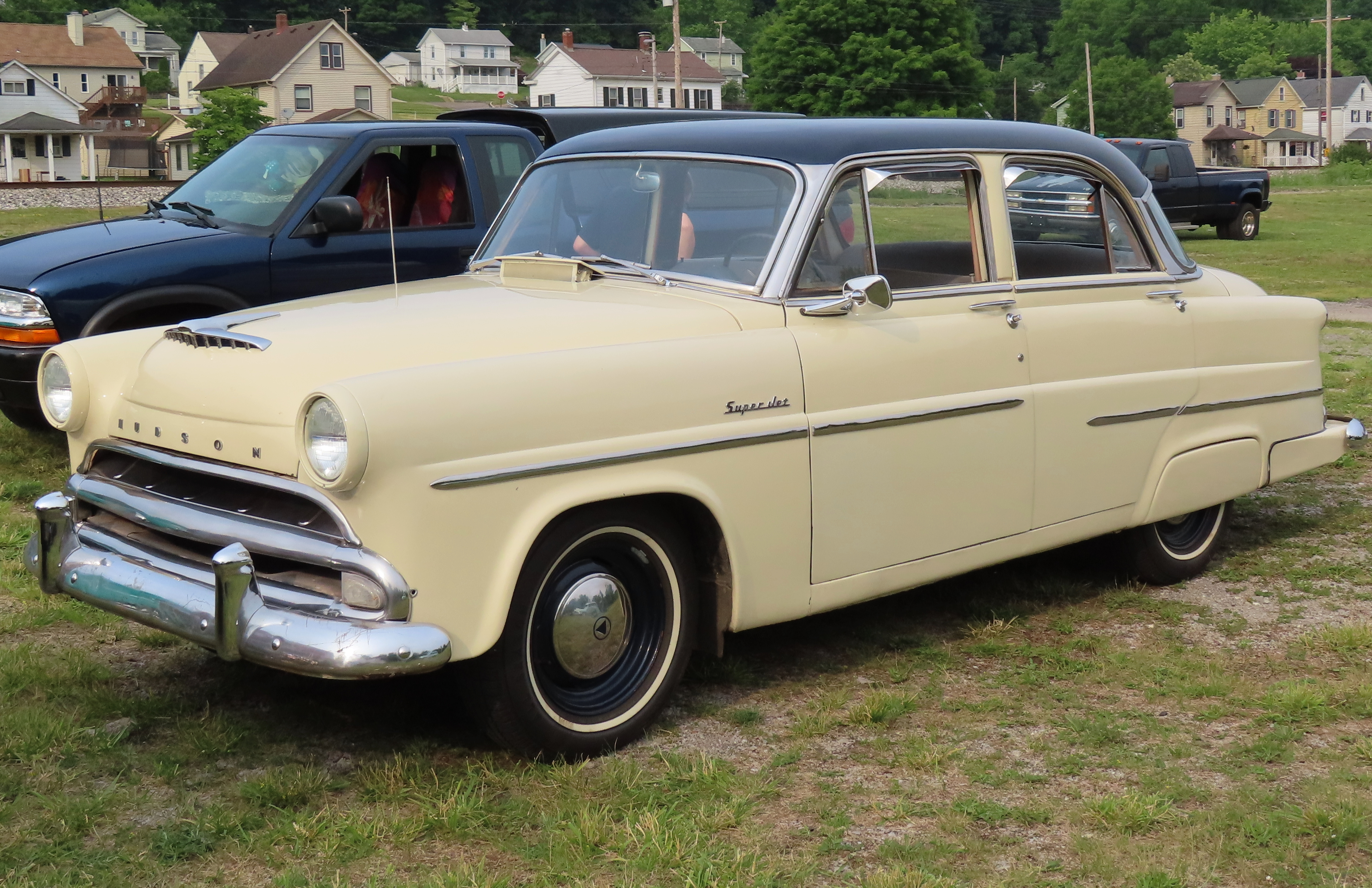
- 1953 Hudson Super Jet 4-Door Sedan

Overview
- Manufacturer: Hudson Motor Car Company (1953); American Motors Corporation (1954)
- Production: 1953–1954; Total 35,367 built

Body and chassis
- Class: Compact
- Body style: 2-door sedan; 4-door sedan; 2-door convertible (one built)
- Layout: FR layout

Powertrain
- Engine: 202 cu in (3.3 L) I6
- Transmission: 3-speed manual; 3-speed manual with overdrive; 4-speed automatic (Hydramatic)

Dimensions
- Wheelbase: 105 inches (2,667 mm)
- Length: 180.7 in (4,590 mm)
- Width: 67 in (1,702 mm)
- Height: 62.8 in (1,595 mm)
- Curb weight: 2,650 lb (1,202 kg) 1953 base 4-door

Chronology
- Successor: Nash Rambler

The Hudson Jet is a compact automobile produced by the Hudson Motor Car Company of Detroit, Michigan, during the 1953 and 1954 model years. The Jet was the automaker's response to the popular Nash Rambler.

The costs of developing and marketing the Jet, along with the fierce competition from the domestic "Big Three" automakers, ultimately led to Hudson's merger with Nash to establish the American Motors Corporation in 1954.

== Background ==
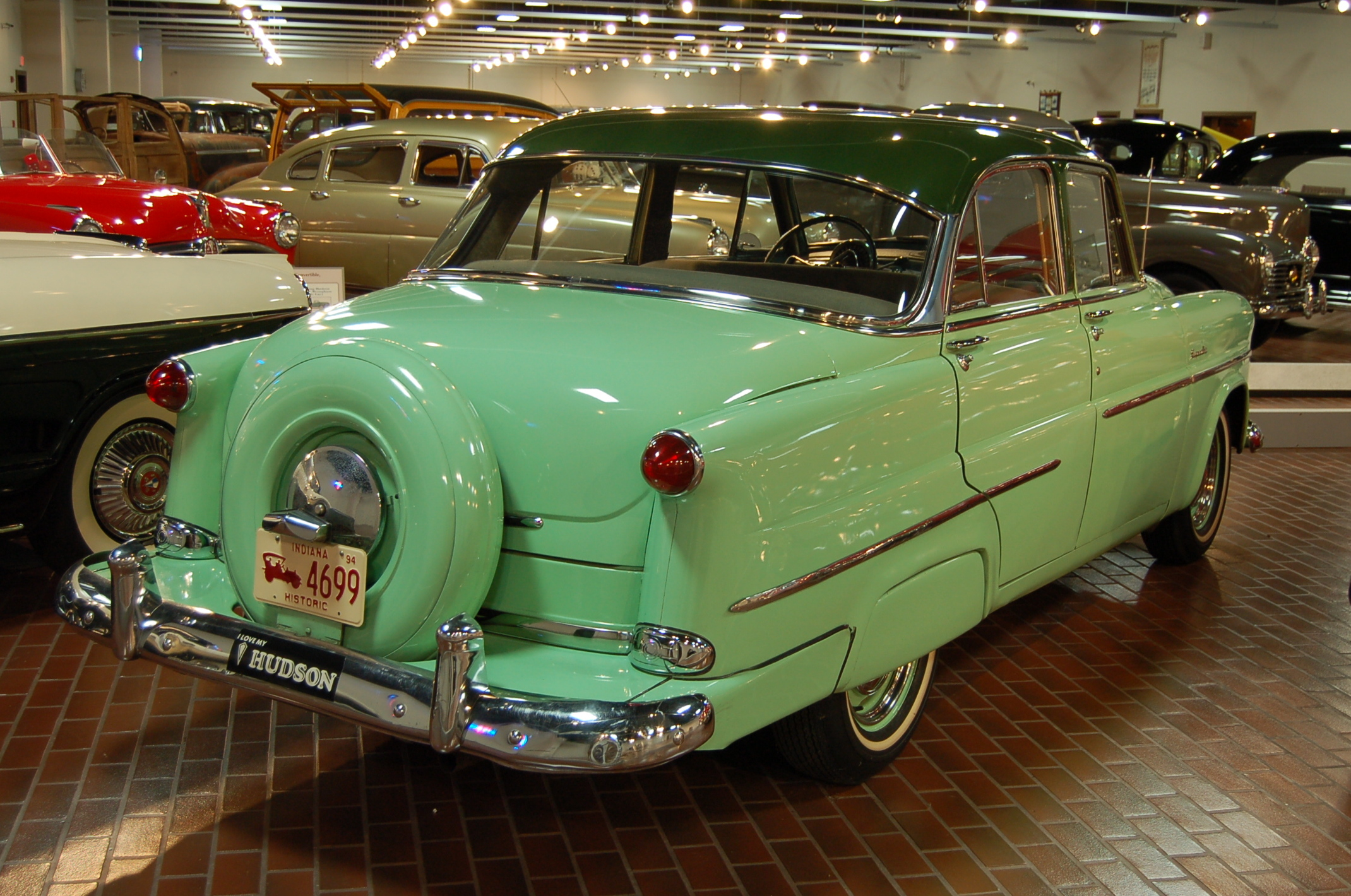
1954 Hudson Jet sedan

The U.S. automakers were unsure about the post-World War II economy, and even Chevrolet and Ford made plans to develop economical, small-sized models. The devastation in Europe and Asia contrasted with the pent-up consumer market in the U.S. The Hudson Motor Car Company was one of several independent firms competing with the much larger "Big Three" U.S. automakers (General Motors, Ford, and Chrysler) that produced mainly "standard" large-sized models. Their conventional cars were successively getting larger and more expensive.

Sensing opportunities in a market segment not served by the "Big Three", a few independent automakers attempted to make inexpensive compact-sized cars. However, these pre-World War II attempts were unsuccessful because of "awkward styling, anemic performance, and poor distribution". Offering consumers lower prices and economy, Nash launched the compact Rambler in April 1950, and Kaiser rolled out the small Henry J in September 1950. These cars were successful when measured by the expectations of their companies since total sales of the two models exceeded 150,000 units by 1951. This amounted to 3% of the total U.S. market, but the Rambler and Henry J were in a market segment that was ignored by the "Big Three" automakers.

Hudson had limited financial resources, and the relative successes of the Rambler and Henry J compact cars signaled a market segment having an opportunity. Therefore, Hudson's management decided to develop a compact model. This meant not taking the option to refurbish its full-size cars or developing a V8 engine, which was becoming popular. Development of the new Hudson compact car involved numerous compromises between the engineering and design staff, the conservative views of Hudson's president, and even the influence of the top-selling Hudson dealership. The resulting Hudson Jet compact included exclusive engineering that included a roomy, comfortable, and solid welded unibody featuring excellent performance for the era, good fuel economy, and low-cost maintenance.

The Jet was introduced in the middle of the 1953 model year and achieved some success in the now crowded compact segment. However, Hudson could not have foreseen the dramatic decline in overall compact car sales during the 1952 through 1954 period, which included three competitive makes. As a result, they could only produce a little more than 20,000 units for the 1953 model year. It was a car with no real vices, but effectively destroyed the Hudson Motor Car Company. Consequently, the company was forced to merge with Nash-Kelvinator, forming American Motors Corporation (AMC), because of the losses resulting from the Jet project along with the falling sales of Hudson's senior line.

== Development ==
The 1950 Fiat 1400 sedan was the source of inspiration for the new small Hudson car. Early clay models of Hudson's new compact car carried the name "Bee" in keeping with the automaker's Wasp and Hornet models.

From the beginning, Hudson's president, A.E. Barit, who was 63 years old in 1953, hampered the Jet project. He disregarded the suggestions of the company's stylists and other advisors. For example, Barit insisted that the compact-sized Jet offer full-size car amenities. While designers attempted to form a car that was lower, wider, and proportionally sleeker to the dimensions of a small compact auto, Barit would not back away from features such as chair-high seating for passengers and a "tall" greenhouse with a roofline that would allow riders to wear hats while in the car. Barit also decided that the Jet's rear design incorporates a high rear fender and a small round taillight design to imitate the Oldsmobile. The car's design was further changed to accommodate the personal likes of Chicago, Illinois Hudson dealer Jim Moran, whose dealership became the number one sales outlet for Hudson, accounting for about 5% of Hudson's total production. Moran fancied the 1952 Ford's wrap-around rear window and roofline. Consequently, Barit ordered a similar design for the Jet. The final result was that the Jet's styling closely mimicked the larger 1952 Ford in many respects.

The strong unitized Monobuilt bodies for the Jet were produced by the Murray Corporation of America of Detroit. One of the reasons for outsourcing the production of bodies "was that Murray agreed to amortize the tooling costs over the production run, reducing the upfront investment," making the Jet possible because Hudson did not have enough resources to pay for the tooling costs. However, the complicated agreement with Murray included a cost-sharing that increased the prices Hudson had to charge for the Jet. For example, the 1953 base price was $1858 for the Jet while a Ford charged $1,734 for a full-size car and an equivalent Chevrolet was only $1,613.

The new small car was powered by an inline L-head 202 cu in (3.3 L) straight-six engine that produced 104 hp (78 kW; 105 PS) at 4000 rpm and 158 lb⋅ft (214 N⋅m) of torque at 1600 rpm. The 202 cu in (3.3 L) engine was a re-engineered version of Hudson's 1932 "3x4.5" 254 cu in (4.2 L) I8, less two cylinders, stroke increased by 1/4", and configured for full-pressure lubrication. The new I6 engine featured a forged steel crankshaft and used cast aluminum pistons with iron rings, floating wristpins but remained using solid lifters. It continued the flathead design at a time when the rest of the industry was moving to overhead valves.

Early Studebaker body development mule vehicles suffered damage because the engine produced so much torque. A "Twin-H power" version with two 1-bbl downdraft carburetors, aluminum cylinder head, and 8.0:1 compression ratio producing 114 hp (85 kW; 116 PS) was optional. This was more power than available then from the standard Ford, Chevrolet, or Plymouth engines.

A manual three-speed column-shifted transmission was standard, with an optional overdrive unit featuring a dashboard-mounted control knob. It could be pushed in at any speed, and briefly releasing the accelerator pedal at speeds above 22 mph (35 km/h) would automatically engage the overdrive unit. Slowing the car below 18 mph (29 km/h) would shift out of overdrive. Pulling the control knob locked out the overdrive and free-wheeling, which was necessary when on steep grades, in heavy traffic, or encountering slippery road conditions. Optional was the four-speed Hydramatic supplied by General Motors, which was the first time Hudson offered a fully automatic transmission in its cars.

== 1953 ==
The Hudson Jet was unveiled in December 1952 at the Hotel Astor in New York City. Hudson was the only make fully committed to stock car racing, so both the founder of NASCAR, Bill France Sr., and Hudson driver, Tim Flock, the Grand National champion, participated. For the 1953 model year, the Jet was the only new nameplate among the domestic automakers. In its introductory year, the Jet was available in either Standard or Super-Jet trim levels, with two- and four-door sedan body styles. Unlike the fastback "step-down" bodied Hudson full-size cars, the Jet was designed as a three-box notchback.

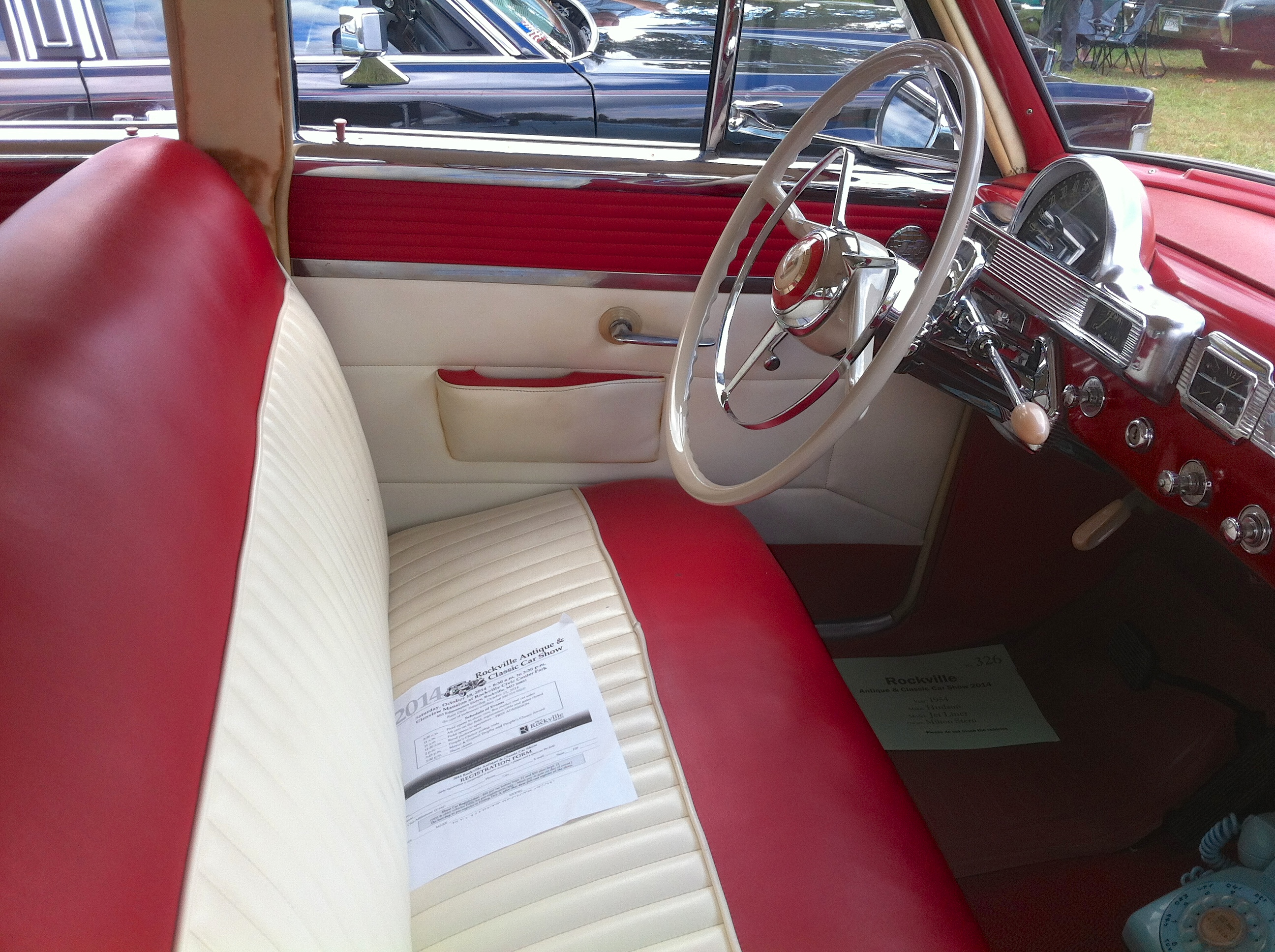
Hudson Jet interiors were well-trimmed and equipped

When the Jet emerged for its introduction, it competed with the Henry J, Nash Rambler, and Willys Aero. It was shorter than the Henry J and the Willys Aero, as well as the narrowest and tallest of all four giving the Jet "a boxy look". Kiplinger's Personal Finance magazine noted that the Jet has "much to recommend it" including "riding qualities [which] match more expensive models", good visibility, quiet operation, and more power than its competition for "excellent pickup and a high top speed". With its optional "Twin-H power", the Jet had more horsepower than any standard engine in the regular-sized Fords, Chevrolets, and Plymouth lines.

While the 1953 senior Hudsons continued to be based upon the 1948 step-down design, these cars looked sleeker than the smaller, slab-sided Jet models. Unlike the Nash Rambler, which offered premium body styles such as a station wagon, hardtop, and convertible, the Jet was available only in sedan form. Although the Hudson Jet had an advantage by being well-appointed, it was priced higher than base-level full-sized Chevrolet, Ford, and Plymouth sedans.

Standard equipment was at a high level for automobiles in this era. Features included a heater, theft-proof locks, rotary door latches, defroster vents, dual horns, full-wheel covers, an ashtray, and a lighted ignition switch, equipment that was typically extra cost on the competing makes. While the inclusion of a heater as standard may be unusual to present-day car users, even the high-priced Cadillac still counted a passenger compartment heater as an option in 1953, that cost $199.

Total production in the U.S. for the 1953 model year was 21,143.

=== The tea cup test ===
Hudson resorted to various marketing ploys to get consumers interested in the Jet, including the "Tea Cup Test". This fuel economy test utilized special kits comprising a glass cylinder, valves, and rubber hoses that Hudson dealers attached to test cars. The glass cylinder was mounted inside the front passenger door, with the hoses feeding into the engine's fuel line. Gasoline equal to the amount held in a teacup was added to the glass cylinder, and a potential customer drove the car. At the same time, a salesperson monitored the cylinder to prove how far a Jet could travel on that small amount of gasoline. Nevertheless, this novel test drive demonstration and advertising campaign failed to convey the Jet's value as an economical car.

== 1954 ==
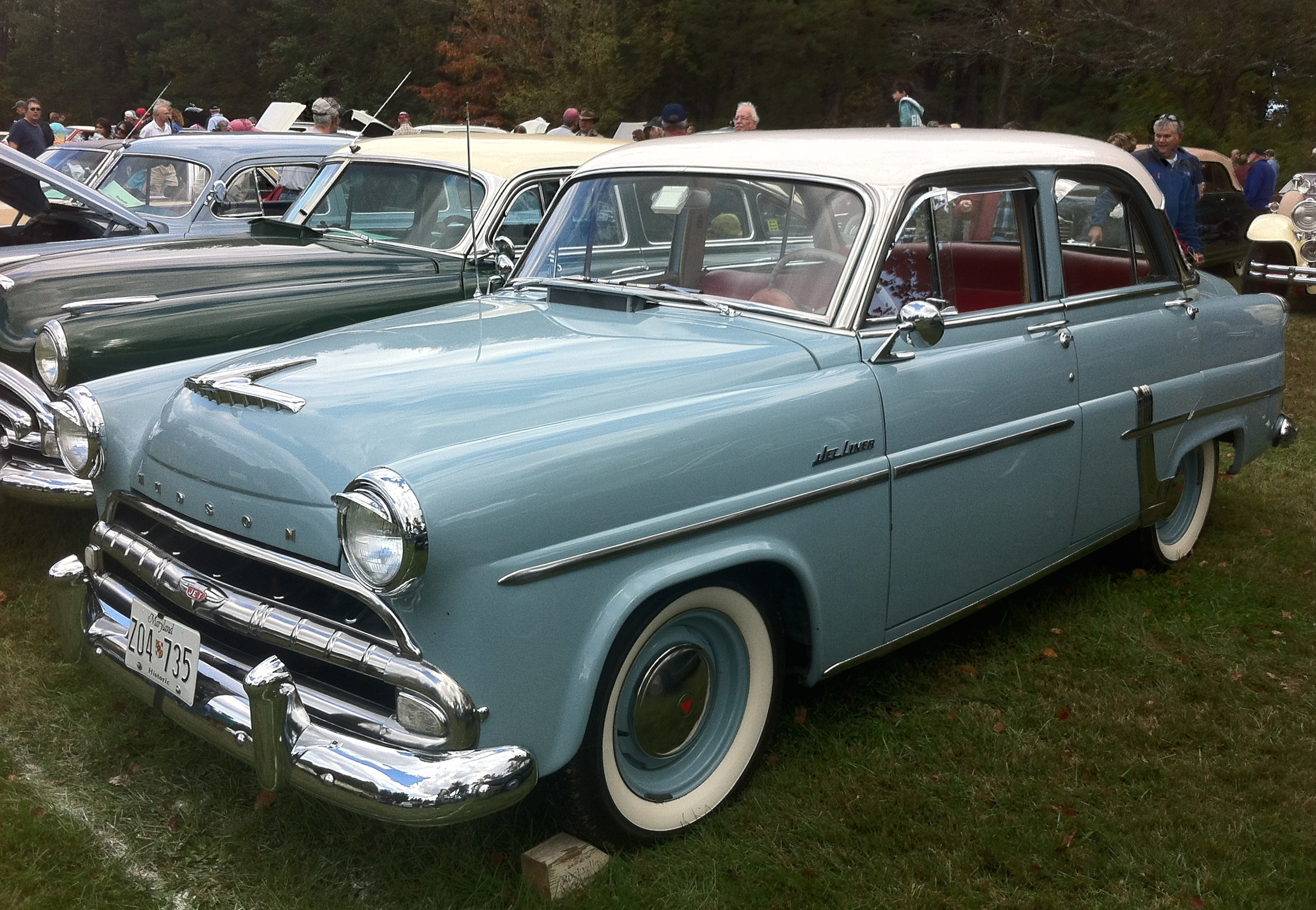
1954 Hudson Jet-Liner 4-door sedan

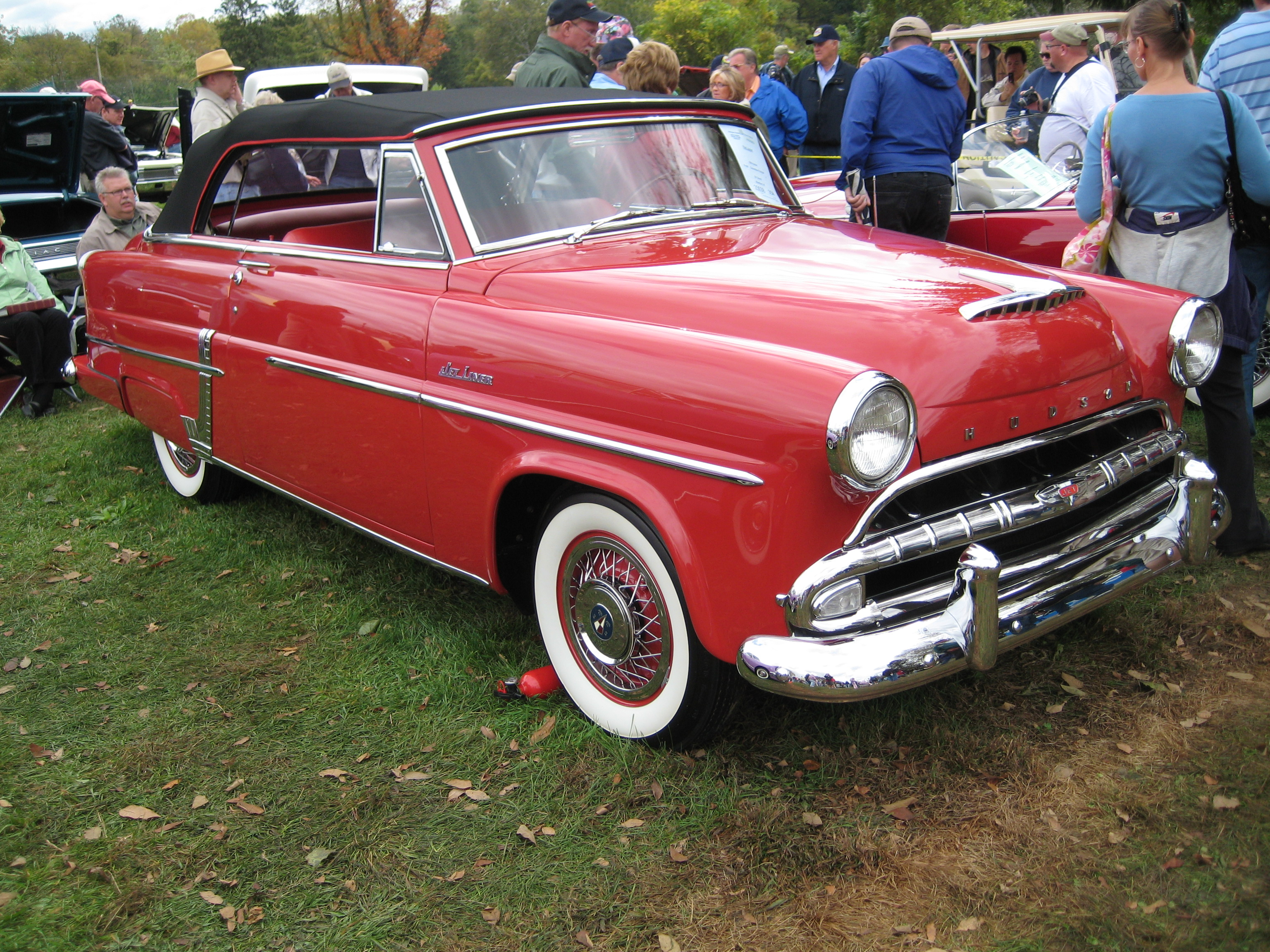
1954 Hudson Jet-Liner convertible

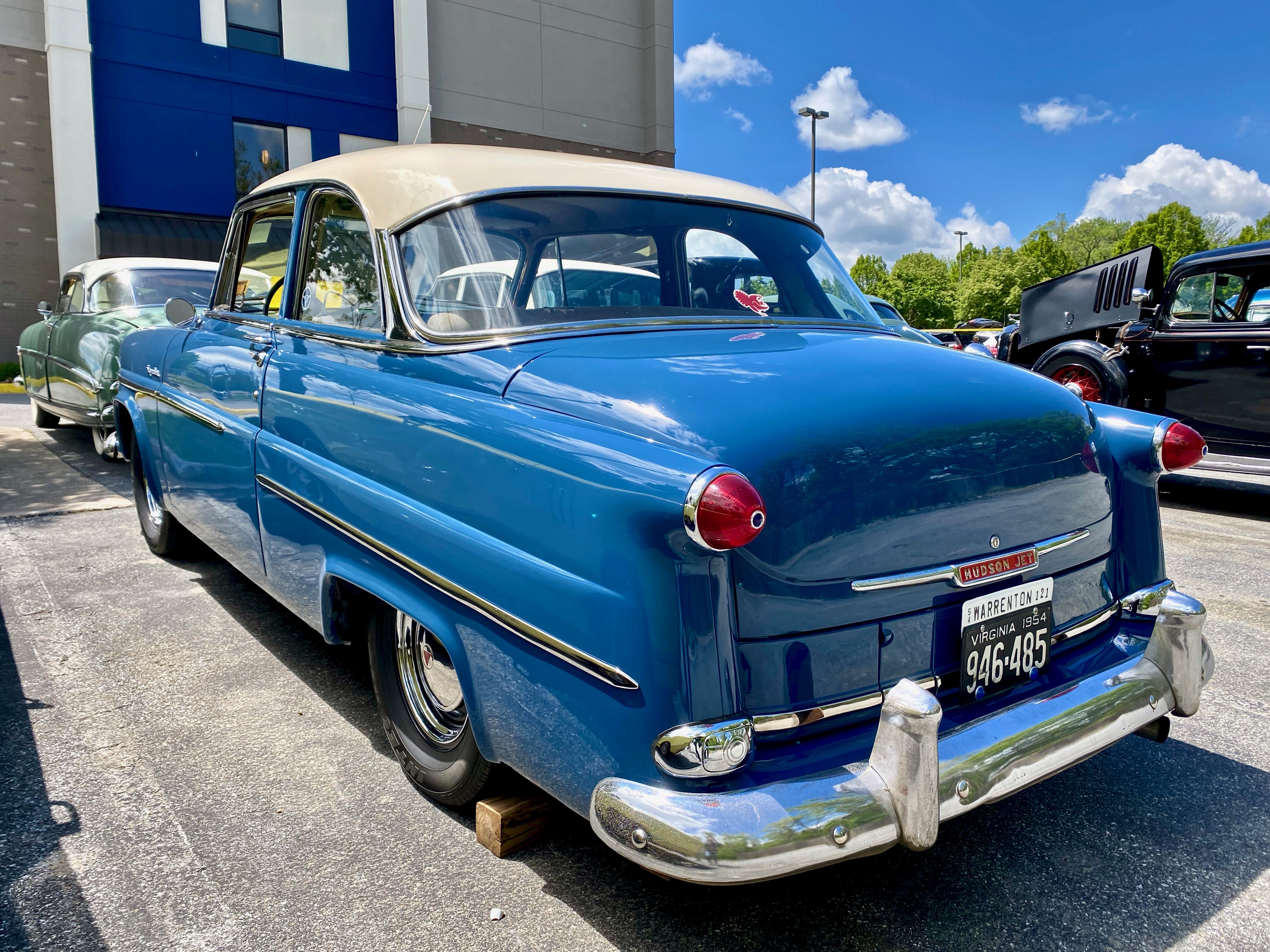
1954 Hudson Jet 2-Door sedan

For 1954, the Jet received minor trim updates to its two- and four-door sedans. A new luxury model, the Jet-Liner, was added, making the Jet a three-series model line. The Jet-Liner came with chrome trim around the windows and body side, gravel shields, and upgraded color-keyed vinyl interiors featuring foam rubber seat cushions. On 12 April 1954, the two-door Family Club Sedan was added to the lineup. $216 cheaper than the base sedan, the Family Club Sedan had a bonnet with no scoop, plainer grille, black rubber windshield surround and spartan interior appointments.

A Jet-Liner convertible was built as an experiment because convertibles were available in Hudson's full-sized cars. This sole example was purchased by Hudson's sales manager, Virgil Boyd.

The 1954 model year production of the Jet series in the U.S. was 14,224 units.

=== American Motors ===
The estimated $10 to 16 million cost of developing and tooling up for the production of the Jet put Hudson into a precarious position. Without any funds to update the senior Hudson line, Barit convinced the Board that a merger into Nash-Kelvinator represented the best chance of protection for Hudson's stockholders. Barit hoped that the Jet would survive the merger as the resulting new American Motors Corporation focused on the niche market of selling smaller cars.

When the merger was completed, and Barit assumed his seat on AMC's Board of Directors in 1954, the Jet was the first Hudson model to be discontinued. The new company could then focus production and marketing on the more successful compact-sized Nash Rambler. Henceforth, Hudson dealers would have badge-engineered versions of Nash's Rambler and the Metropolitan sub-compact to sell as Hudson products.

== Motorsports ==
The Hudson Jet was fielded in the grueling Carrera Panamericana, described as the world's greatest road race. The 1953 race included Malcolm Eckart finishing in 53rd place, Segurs Chapultepec in 41st, and Enrique Paredes in 42nd out of the 182 cars that started. Francisco Ramirez finished eighth in the Turismo Especial.

In drag racing, an Ike Smith–prepared Hudson Jet with a 170 hp (127 kW; 172 PS) "Twin H" 308 cu in (5.0 L) I6 Hornet engine ran consistently low-14-second times. The firewall required modification as the larger engine was not available from the factory, but the National Hot Rod Association (NHRA) made an exception to its rules for this car.

== Legacy ==
Hudson "gambled" to introduce a new compact car, yet its styling was described as "bland, its engineering was nothing if not conventional, and it was priced higher than a full-sized Chevy, Ford, or Plymouth." Automobile historian Richard M. Langworth has called the Jet "the car that torpedoed Hudson". The new car "was intended to save Hudson, but it only accelerated the proud Detroit automaker's downfall". While there was a negative effect of the Jet on the company's financial condition, it was also a time when market forces, including steel prices and labor costs, as well as the sales war between Ford and Chevrolet, contributed to the demise of the smaller "independent" automakers such as Packard, Studebaker, and Willys.

=== The Italia connection ===
The Jet was the platform for a sleek two-passenger coupé named Italia. The sporty Hudson Italia was designed by Frank Spring to be different from the Jet, even though Barit wanted a more conventional automobile. The limited production Italia featured a body built by Carrozzeria Touring of Milano, with the Jet's standard drivetrain including the I6 engine producing 104 hp (78 kW; 105 PS). The Italia is arguably "one of the most uniquely designed American sports cars produced during the '50s." One prototype four-door sedan was also built by Carrozzeria Touring that was unofficially called "Hornet Italia" although it did not have name badges.
