= A. E. Barit =

American businessman (1890–1974)

Abraham Edward Barit
- Born: August 30, 1890; Jersey City, New Jersey
- Died: July 14, 1974 (aged 83); Grosse Pointe Park, Michigan
- Occupation: Automobile industry executive
- Years active: 1910 – 1956
- Employers: Hudson Motors (1910 – 1954); American Motors (1954 – 1956)
- Known for: The low center of gravity "step-down" automobile design
- Notable work: Hudson Hornet; Hudson Jet

Abraham Edward Barit (August 30, 1890 – July 14, 1974) was an American industrialist who served as the president and CEO of the Hudson Motor Car Company from 1936 to 1954 when Hudson merged with Nash Motors to form American Motors Corporation (AMC). Barit served on the board of AMC following the merger of the two automakers.

== Career ==
Barit was born to poor parents in Jersey City, New Jersey. He was briefly the secretary for the purchasing agent at the Chalmers-Detroit Motor Company. He began his career with Hudson in 1910, by joining the firm's purchasing department, less than six months after the production of the company's first automobile. He was a stenographer, and had no flair for market analysis, product development, or design.

Barit was named president and CEO of Hudson following the death of the corporation's founding president and CEO Roy D. Chapin in 1936.

Using lines of credit arranged for Chapin before his death, Barit helped to steer Hudson back toward profitability in the late 1930s. In 1938, Barit proposed a plan to reduce used-car inventories as a method to stimulate not only the national economy, but also help employment and sales in the automobile industry. Sales of Hudson rebounded through the economic recession of 1938. Marking the 30th anniversary of the founding of the company in 1939, Barit kept up an optimistic business view by highlighting Hudson's opportunities.

However, the domestic automobile industry was fiercely competitive with many once-famous firms such as Hupmobile, Chandler, Peerless, Winton, and Pierce-Arrow going bankrupt and Hudson facing a similar fate as it posted a loss of $1.5 million in 1940.

The company shifted quickly for World War II production. Hudson made antiaircraft guns, engines for landing barges, and aircraft parts netting an average of nearly $2 million a year during the war.

After the war, Barit wanted Hudson to be a leader among the independent domestic motormakers. In 1945, Barit successfully fought off a below-market rate tender offer for Hudson Motors by the Fisher family—founders of General Motors Fisher Body division. Under Barit's leadership, Hudson was one of the first automakers to convert to civilian production. Production for 1946 totaled 93,000 or nearly 6,000 more than it made in 1940. Hudson increased production in 1947 to 103,000. This allowed Hudson to double its profit to $5.7 million in 1947 compared to the previous year.

Barit wanted Hudson to build on the automobile industry's long list of "firsts" (e.g., the first aluminum pistons, the first rear luggage compartment, the first steering-wheel gearshift). The conservative Barit gave the go-ahead for Hudson's step-down body design—a revolutionary design that catapulted the firm to the forefront of automotive body engineering in the postwar market. Barit invested $18 million to retool for the new design.

When combined with the firm's Twin-H straight-6, Hudson's corporate-sponsored race teams, headed by Marshall Teague, dominated the NASCAR circuit from 1951 through 1954.

In the early 1950s, instead of reshaping Hudson's aging step-down design, or investing in V8 engine technology, Barit guided the company toward developing a compact car that Hudson could market. He "meddled" in the development and design of the company's products, failing to capitalize on the expertise of the firm's professionals in those areas. Instead of relying on engineering and styling to duplicate the previous success of the step-down design, Barit imposed his requirements for chair-high seating and allowed others outside of Hudson to influence the design, namely Chicago, Illinois Hudson dealer Jim Moran, whose dealership became number one sales outlet for Hudson, accounting for about 5% of Hudson's total production. Moran fancied the 1952 Ford's wrap-around rear window and roofline, thus influenced Barit to introduce a similar design for the new car. The final result was that the car's styling closely mimicked the larger 1952-1954 Ford in many respects which emerged as the antithesis of the low-slung step-down bodies.

The new compact car, named the Hudson Jet, did not attract buyers, and the expense of its development (and failure) combined with Hudson's lack of resources to update their senior line of cars spelled the end for the company. Hudson Motors was subsequently acquired through a friendly merger by Nash Motors in 1954, creating American Motors Corporation (AMC).

Barit served on the board of AMC until 1956 when he resigned in protest over the likelihood that Hudson would be phased out of production. Barit felt that his trust in AMC had been betrayed. George W. Romney, AMC's president, felt that Hudson and Nash were no longer relevant players in the automotive market and retired both names at the end of the 1957 model year production to make way for the new Rambler brand.

For personal use, Barit had a 1951 Hudson modified by the Derham Body Company to a limousine that was later updated to Hudson's 1953 front-end treatment. This car is now part of the collections at The Henry Ford.

According to his son, Robert Barit, the last car that A. E. Barit owned was a Hudson, and after it was retired, he refused to own any other automobile brand.

A. E. Barit died at his home in Grosse Pointe Park, Michigan, on July 14, 1974.

== Sources ==
- Langworth, Richard M. (1977). Hudson: The Classic Postwar Years, 1946-1957. Motorbooks International. ISBN 9780879387297.
- Conde, John A. (1987). The American Motors Family Album. American Motors Corporation. OCLC 3185581.
- Social Security Death Index, Barit, Abraham E.

Business positions
Preceded by Roy D. Chapin	Chairman and CEO of Hudson Motor Car Company; 1936–1956	Succeeded by merged into American Motors
