= Henry J =

Compact car produced by Kaiser-Frazer Corporation

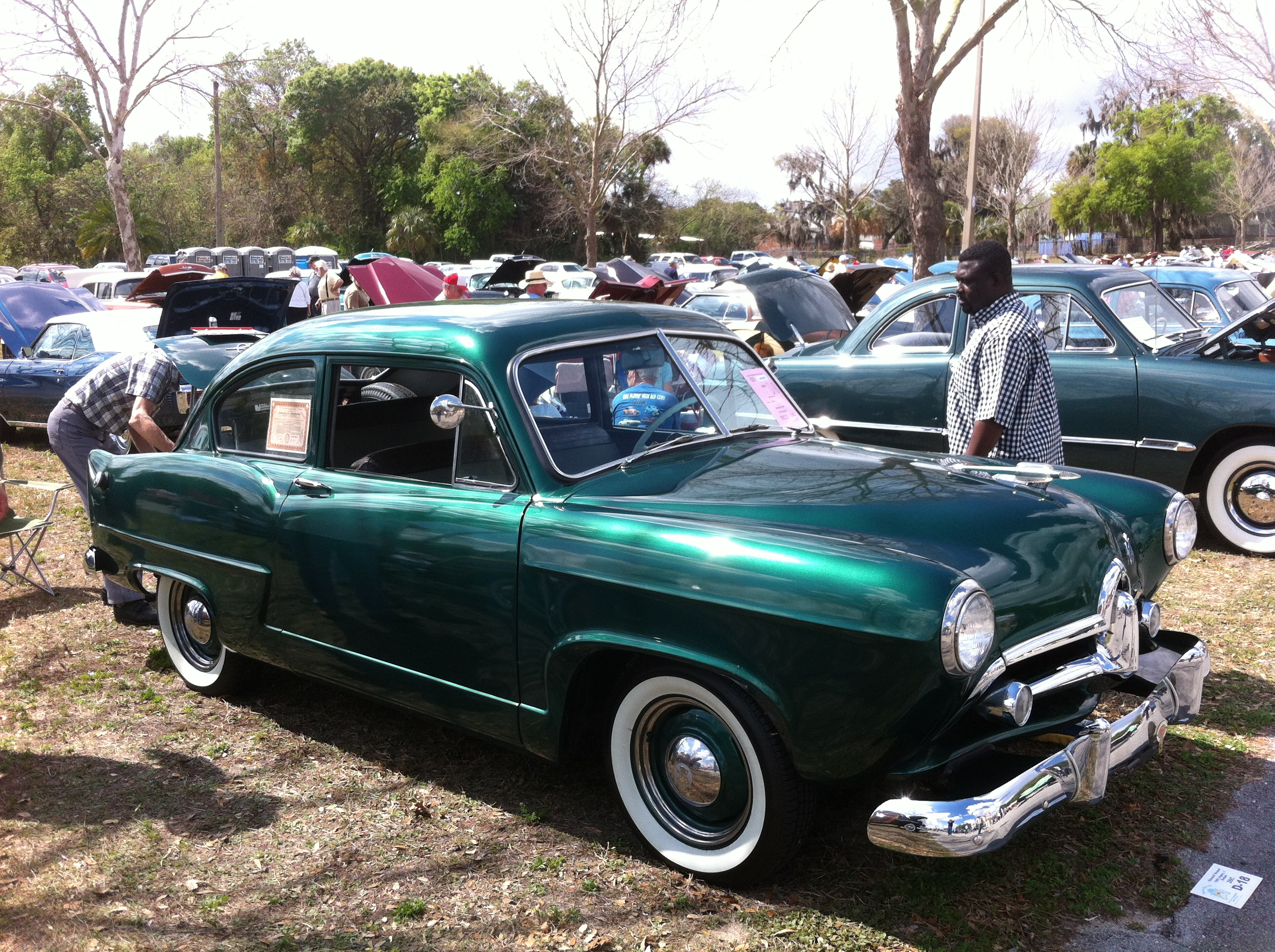
- 1951 Henry J

Overview
- Manufacturer: Kaiser-Frazer Corporation
- Production: July 1950–1954
- Assembly: United States: Willow Run, Michigan

Body and chassis
- Body style: 2-door sedan
- Layout: FR layout

Powertrain
- Engine: 134.2 cu in (2.2 L) I4; 161 cu in (2.6 L) I6
- Transmission: 3-speed manual

Dimensions
- Wheelbase: 100 in (2,540 mm)
- Length: 174.5 in (4,432 mm) (1950); 178 in (4,521 mm) (1953–1954)
- Width: 70"
- Curb weight: 2,341 lb (1,062 kg)

The Henry J is an American automobile built by the Kaiser-Frazer Corporation and named after its chairman, Henry J. Kaiser. Production of six-cylinder models began in their Willow Run factory in Michigan in July 1950, and four-cylinder production started shortly after Labor Day, 1950.

The official public introduction was on 28 September 1950, and the car was marketed until 1954. The Korean War impacted the production and sales of the new compact car.

== Development ==
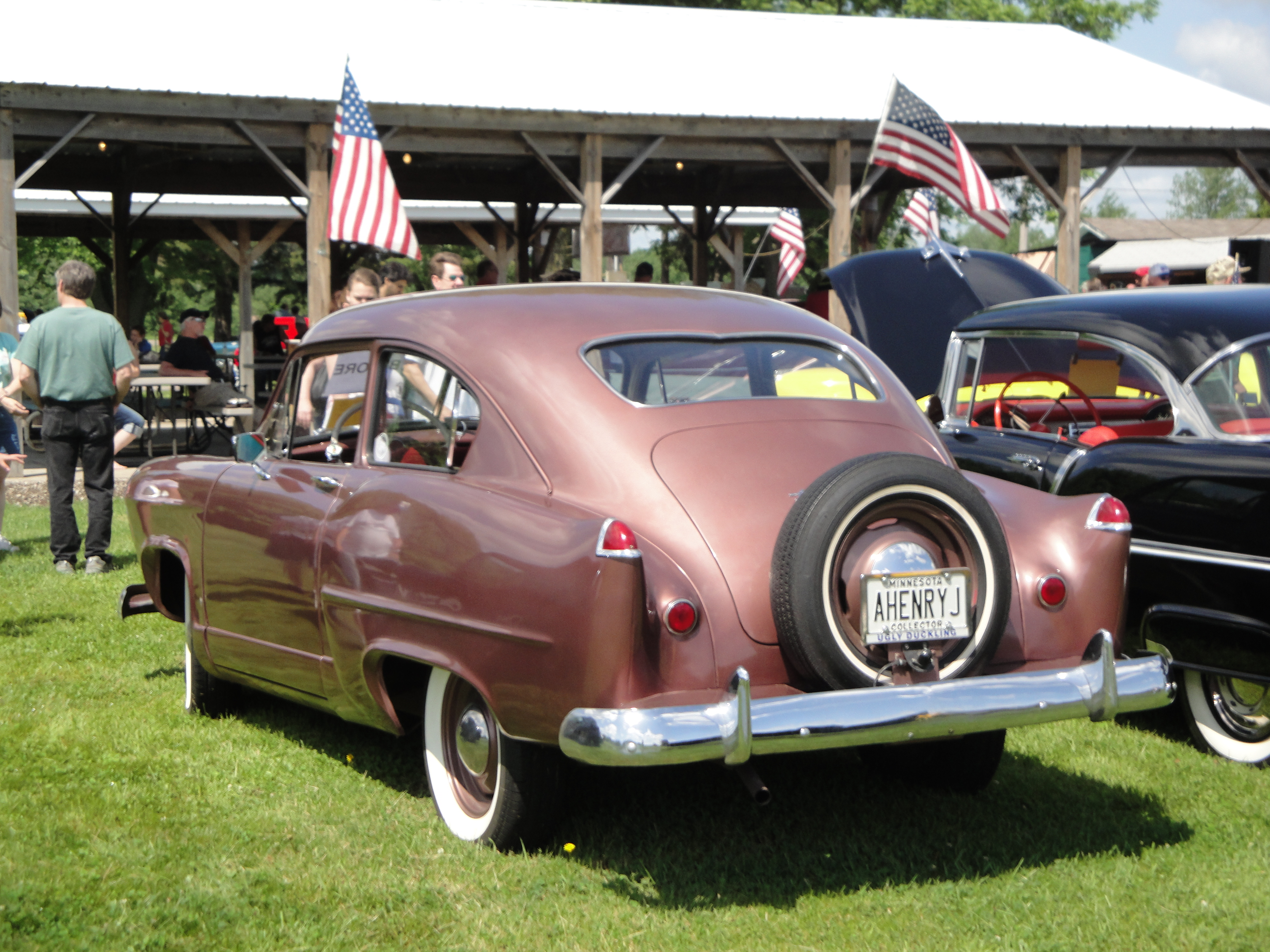
1951 Kaiser Henry J Rear View

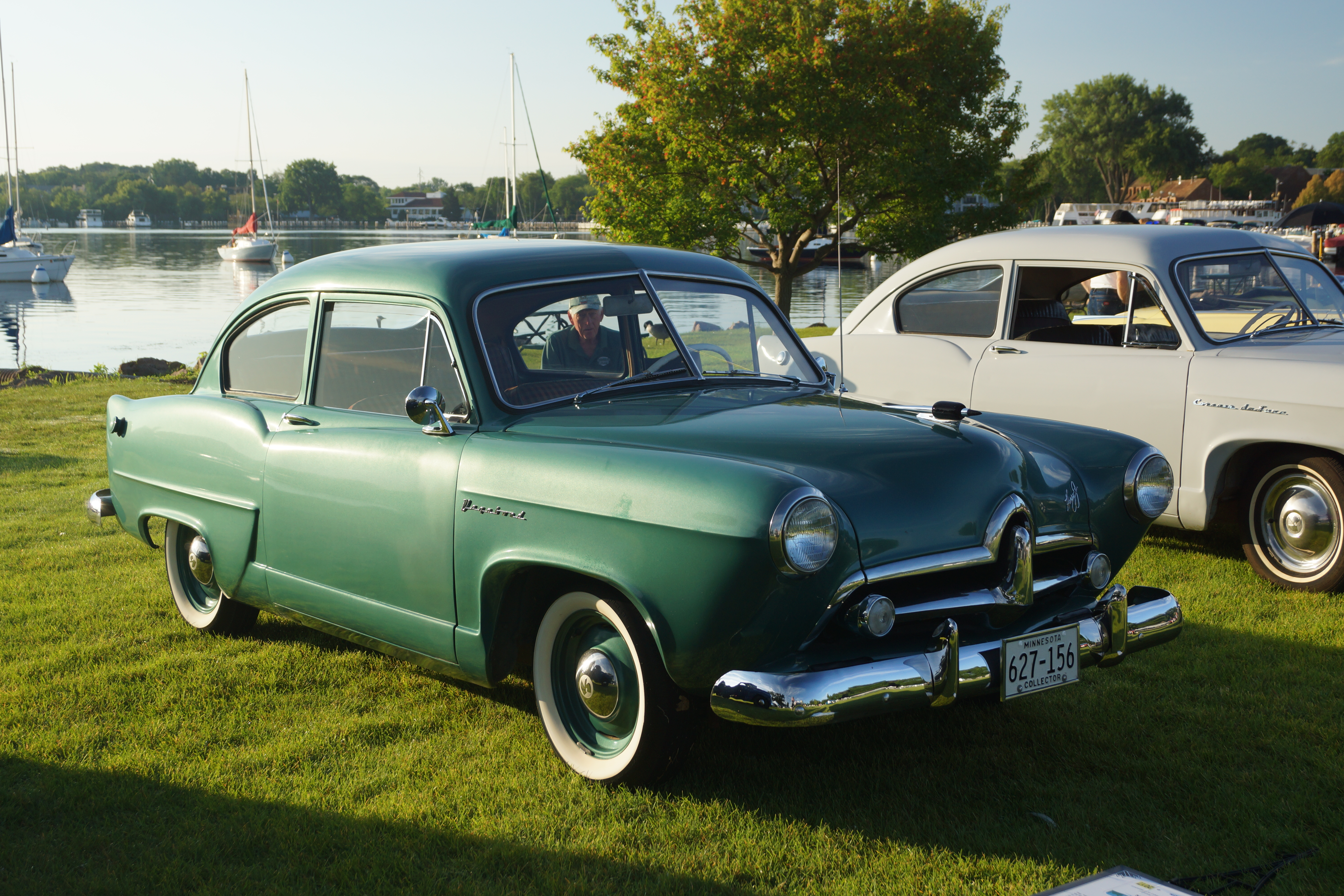
1952 Henry J Vagabond

The Henry J was the idea of Henry J. Kaiser, who sought to increase sales of his Kaiser automotive line by adding a car that could be built inexpensively and thus affordable for the average American, in the same vein as Henry Ford's Model T. The goal was to attract "less affluent buyers who could only afford a used car", and Kaiser's attempt became a pioneering American compact car.

The Kaiser-Frazer Corporation received a $34 million loan from the Reconstruction Finance Corporation in 1949 to finance the project. This monetary support specified various particulars of the vehicle. Kaiser-Frazer would commit to design a car that, in its base form, retailed (including federal tax and retail delivery preparation charge) for no more than $1,300.00 (US$17,396 in 2025 dollars). The requirements for the car included seating at least five adults, being capable of sustained speeds of at least 50 miles per hour (80 km/h), and it was to be available for consumer purchase no later than 30 September 1950.

A compact car design proposal was made by Howard "Dutch" Darrin that utilized the already approved future Kaiser, but with a shortened wheelbase. However, Henry J. Kaiser wanted an entirely new car and decided on a design developed by American Metal Products, "a supplier of frames and springs for car seats." In an attempt to improve the appearance of the car, Darrin contributed a "dip" to the beltline, windshield, and rear window as well as adding little tailfins.

To achieve the low-price objective, the Henry J was designed to have the fewest possible components and built with the fewest parts. To save body stamping costs, early Henry Js did not have rear trunk lids; owners had to access the trunk by folding down the rear seat. Another cost-saving measure was to offer the car only as a two-door sedan with fixed rear windows. Also lacking in the basic version were a glove compartment, armrests, a passenger-side inside sun visor, and flow-through ventilation.

Power for the Henry J was delivered by a 134.2 cu in (2.2 L) four-cylinder 68 hp (51 kW; 69 PS) engine. Later models were available with a 161 cu in (2.6 L) L-head six-cylinder engine producing 80 hp (60 kW; 81 PS). Willys-Overland supplied the engines. The four-cylinder was the same engine used in the CJ-3A series Jeeps, with only slight modifications to a few parts; the block and internal components were interchangeable with the CJ-3A engine. The Henry J production provided a substantial revenue source for Willys-Overland. This standard engine could achieve up to 35 mpg_{‑US} (6.7 L/100 km; 42 mpg_{‑imp}) when driven conservatively.

Before the Henry J was released to the market, engineers took the first production models to Arkansas for durability testing. Experts computed that driving 100 miles (161 km) on the roughest roads would equal 5,000 miles (8,047 km) of everyday driving.

The Korean War broke out as the Henry J was launched. Government allocations prioritized materials for the military, limiting steel for civilian automobiles. Kaiser's Willow Run plant in Michigan also had a subcontracting agreement for Fairchild C-119 Flying Boxcar planes, resulting in assembly line disruptions.

== Marketing ==
While the Henry J was priced low, a Chevrolet 150 model could be bought for less than $200 more, and the Chevy included opening rear windows and a trunk lid. The standard Chevrolet, Ford, Plymouth, and other low-priced competitors were also larger cars, offering more interior room. Kaiser-Frazer began offering an opening trunk lid as part of an "Accessory Group" (preferred equipment group) during the 1951 model year, along with a variety of other dress-up items. Advertising for the Henry J still focused on operating costs at a time when the rationing of gasoline by the War Production Board ended, and fuel sold for about 27 cents per gallon. The car could achieve 25 mpg_{‑US} (9.4 L/100 km; 30 mpg_{‑imp}), and in 1953, a Henry J won the Mobil Economy Run.

The Henry J proved to be a sales disappointment for Kaiser. Leftover 1951 models were modified with an outside continental tire and an upgraded interior to be marketed as the 1952 Henry J "Vagabond" versions. Available in either four- or six-cylinder engines, a total of 7,017 were sold.

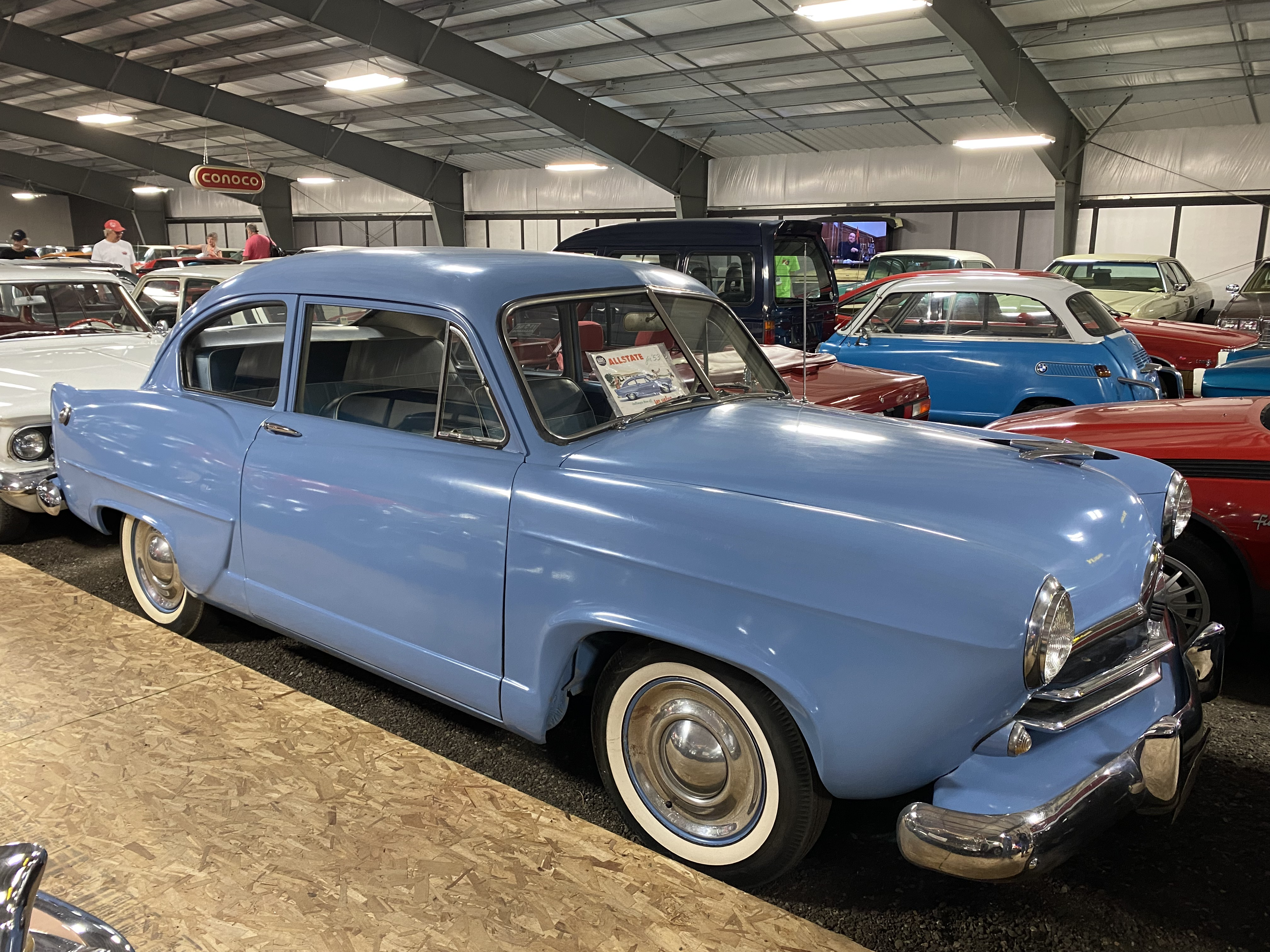
1953 Allstate sold by Sears at the Rambler Ranch

In 1952, Kaiser began selling rebadged Henry J model through Sears, under the Allstate nameplate. The Allstate cars were nearly identical to Henry Js, but featured a unique grille, hood ornament, hubcaps, identification badges, and interior trim, as well as equipped with Allstate-brand tires and batteries. After two years of disappointing sales, Sears dropped marketing for the car.

The Henry J was also available in Japan from 1951 through 1954, through a licensing deal with East Japan Heavy-Industries, part of the Mitsubishi group.

In 1952, the Henry J Corsair (four-cylinder) and Corsair DeLuxe (six-cylinder) models were introduced, featuring improved styling and quality, as well as higher prices. The front end had a full-width grille while the taillamps were incorporated into the rear fender fins.

The 1953 Henry J Corsair had few styling changes and featured the smaller L-head four-cylinder engine. Kaiser's advertising promoted it as "the easiest car on the road to drive, handle, park, service, run, maintain, and of course the easiest to pay for." A padded dash became standard.

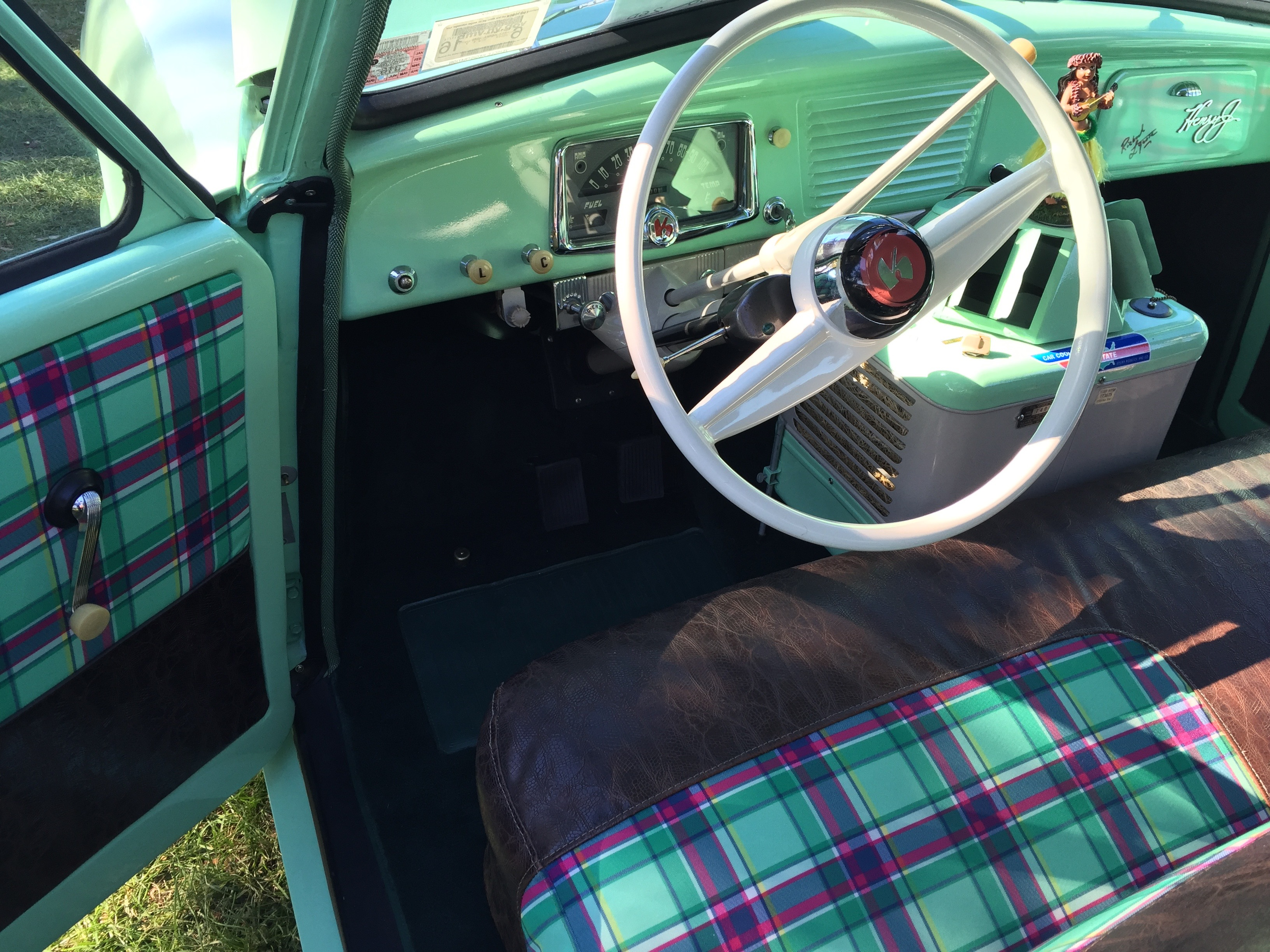
1953 Henry J Corsair Deluxe interior

For 1954, the four-cylinder Corsair price was reduced to $1,286, with the six-cylinder Corsair DeLuxe listed for $1,437, or $124 lower than the previous year. New safety features included a padded dashboard and the windshield was mounted so it would pop-out on impact, as well as a "Penny-Minder" carburetor that was claimed to achieve 30 mpg_{‑US} (7.8 L/100 km; 36 mpg_{‑imp}).

Sales declined each year the car was on the market. In 1950, it had 1.35% of the market, while in 1954 it achieved only 0.02%. While the Henry J was inexpensive for consumers, its manufacturing and labor costs were high. Henry J. Kaiser had hoped to profit through volume production; however, the slow sales of cars negated his plan. The automobile market was competitive, and challenging the domestic "Big Three" — General Motors, Ford, and Chrysler — proved difficult as price wars began that had a devastating impact on small domestic automakers.

Concurrently, Nash's compact Rambler sales were successful, partly because Nash introduced it in 1950 as a high-value convertible-only model and marketed the small car with numerous standard features to avoid consumers seeing it as inferior or substandard. By 1953, it was reviewed in Kiplinger's Personal Finance as "well-equipped and stylish, the little Rambler is economical and easy to drive" in either convertible, station wagon, or hardtop (no "B-pillar") body styles." On the other hand, the Henry J was a plainly trimmed two-door sedan model; consumers understood the difference between "inexpensive" and "cheap" and they negatively perceived the Henry J. By September 1953, the Henry J was described in a small car comparison by Kiplinger's Personal Finance as "in trouble ... the closest thing to a "basic transportation" car on the road today, and as such, does not appeal to today's car buyers ... In trade-in value, it ranks among the lowest."

== End of production ==
The Korean War impacted the smaller domestic automakers. Following the removal of government controls on materials in March 1953, managers at Ford wanted to out-produce Chevrolet, and a sales war among the "Big Three" (General Motors, Ford, and Chrysler) to increase their market share further compounded problems for the independent automakers.

Kaiser's effort to boost sales in the low-priced market segment by adding a small car to its product line came at a time when consumers were demanding big cars. With Kaiser's acquisition of Willys-Overland in early 1953, the Kaiser-Frazer Division changed its name to Willys Motors, Incorporated, and management elected to discontinue the Henry J at the end of the 1954 model year.

Kaiser leased its Willow Run factory to General Motors (after a major fire destroyed GM's Hydramatic transmission plant in Livonia on 12 August 1953). As a consequence, Kaiser's vehicle assembly was consolidated at Jeep's Toledo Complex. However, production of the Henry J remained in Michigan. Collaterally, Willys Aero passenger cars (1952-1955) continued production in Toledo.

Efforts to sell off the remaining Henry J vehicles resulted in an abbreviated assembly run. The 1954 models used up the leftover or incomplete 1953 cars. These can be distinguished from the 1953 version only by their "54" prefix in the serial number.
