= Nash Rambler =

Compact-sized cars produced by Nash Motors

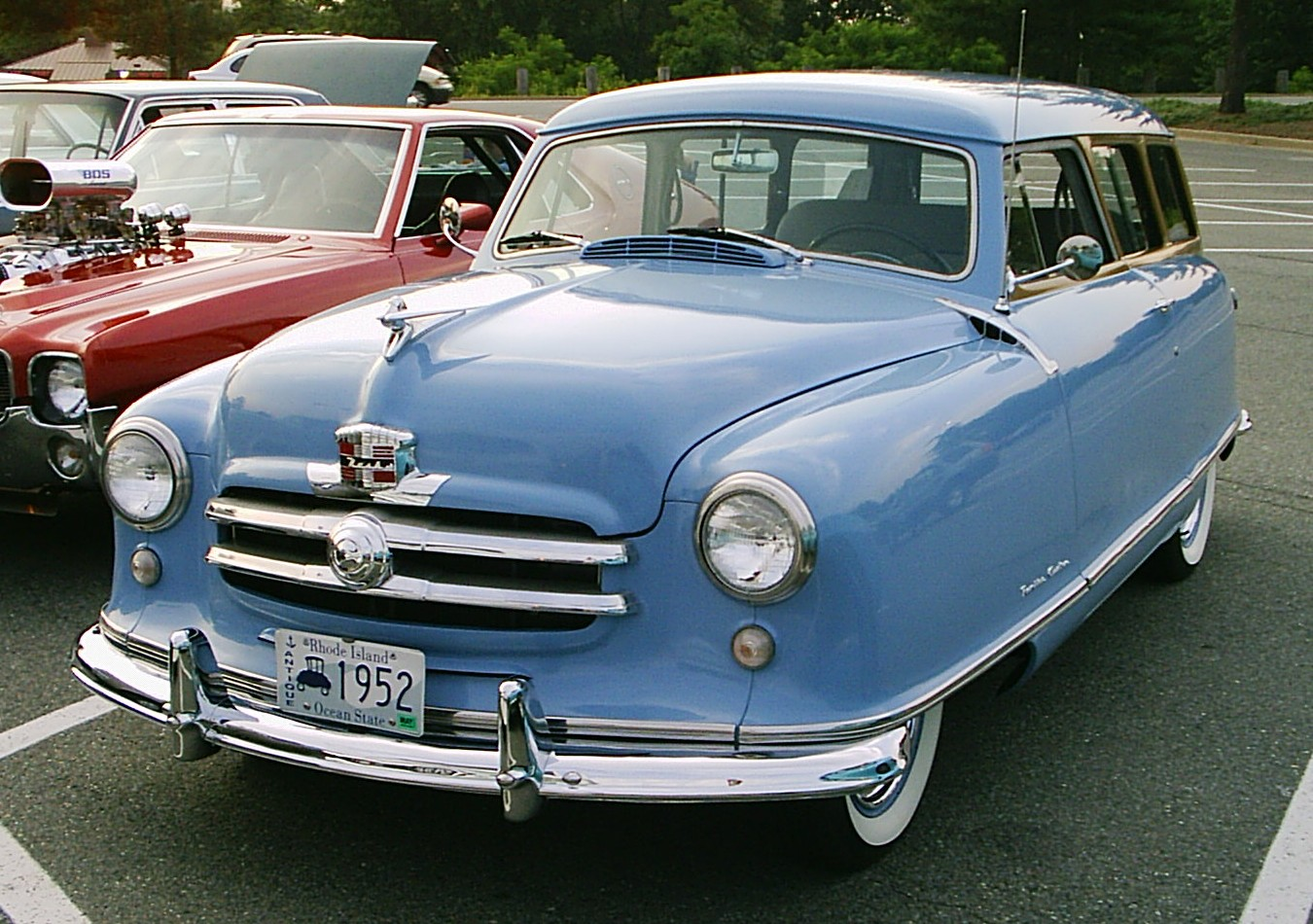
- 1952 Nash Rambler Custom station wagon

Overview
- Manufacturer: Nash Motors (1950–1954); American Motors Corporation (1954–1955)
- Production: 1950–1955, and 1958-1960
- Assembly: United States: El Segundo, California; Canada: Danforth Ave (Toronto, Ontario) Plant (1956)
- Designer: Meade Moore (chief engineer), Theodore Ulrich (body & styling), Pininfarina (1953 restyle)

Body and chassis
- Class: Compact
- Layout: FR layout

Chronology
- Successor: Rambler American

The Nash Rambler is a compact car manufactured and marketed by the Nash Motors division of Nash-Kelvinator Corporation for model years 1950-1954. It has a front-engine, rear-wheel-drive layout with sedan, station wagon, and fixed-profile convertible body styles.

Nash established the compact market segment by using the Rambler's size and a combination of feature and equipment. The vehicle was designed to be small and economical while offering higher levels of equipment than typical compact cars.

When Nash-Kelvinator merged with the Hudson Motor Car Company in 1954, the Rambler became a product of the resulting American Motors Corporation (AMC), which in a rare feat, subsequently reintroduced the Rambler for model years 1958-1960. The Rambler was manufactured in Kenosha, Wisconsin over its two separate production runs.

== Development ==
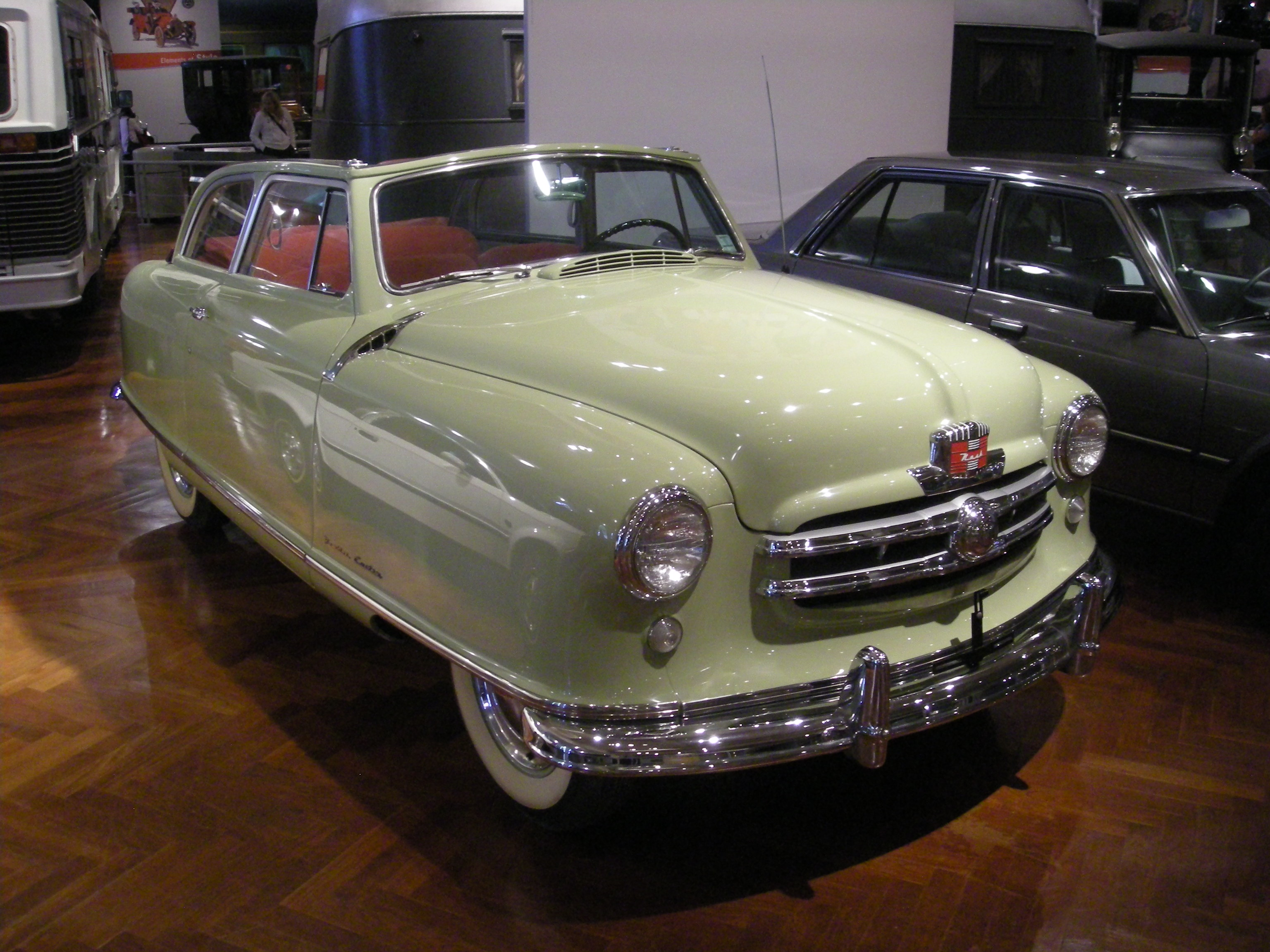
1950 Nash Rambler Custom Landau Convertible Coupe

Nash-Kelvinator's President George W. Mason saw that the company needed to compete more effectively and insisted a new car had to be different from the existing models in the market offered by the "Big Three" U.S. automakers. Mason also realized the fundamental problem that had eluded other automakers trying to market smaller-sized cars to Americans: low price was not enough to sell in large volumes, but "also had to be big enough to appeal to families as their primary car." Therefore, the Rambler was designed to be smaller than contemporary cars, yet still able to accommodate five passengers comfortably. Nash engineers had initially penned the styling during World War II.

The new car was the company's entry into the lower-price segment dominated by Chevrolet, Ford, and Plymouth models. The Rambler was designed to be lighter and have smaller dimensions than the other popular cars. With a strategy focused on efficiency, Nash could save on materials in its production while owners would have better fuel economy than other cars of the era. The Nash Rambler rode on a 100 in (2,540 mm) wheelbase, and power came from Nash's proven 172.6 cu in (2.8 L) L-head (flathead) straight-6 cylinder engine that produced 82 hp (61 kW; 82 hp).

Following the design of the larger "senior" Nash models, the compact Rambler employed pontoon styling, with an overall rounded form that enveloped the body – and Nash's characteristic fender skirts also enclosing the front wheels. This front skirts did not impair the car's cornering ability significantly.

The compact Rambler line was designed with several body styles, but the inaugural year was limited to a single model: a fully equipped 2-door fixed-profile convertible. The decision to bring the new car out first in a higher market segment with more standard features was a calculated risk by Mason. Foremost in this strategy was the need to give the new Rambler a positive public image. Mason knew the car would fail if seen by the public as a "cheap little car". This was confirmed in small car comparisons in the media that described the "well-equipped and stylish, the little Rambler is economical and easy to drive" with no "stripped-down" versions, but available in only high-end convertible, station wagon, or hardtop (no "B-pillar") body styles. He knew what Crosley was finding out with its line of mini cars, and what the Henry J would teach Kaiser Motors; namely, that Americans would rather buy a nice used car than a new car that is perceived as inferior or substandard.

In contrast to traditional convertibles that used frame-free side windows, the Rambler was a fixed-profile convertibles, retaining the bodywork's doors and rear-side window frames, their metal structure serving as the side guides for the retractable waterproof canvas top. This design allowed Nash to use unibody construction, making the body sufficiently rigid for an open-top car without additional bracing. The strength of the windshield pillars and roof-rail structure was demonstrated by the entire vehicle flipped upside down, and the rails and supports were undamaged. The convertible top is cable-driven and electrically operated. The design is similar to other fixed-profile convertibles, including the 1936 Fiat 500 "Topolino", Nissan Figaro (1991), Citroën 2CV (1948–1990), Vespa 400 (1957), and the 1957 Fiat 500 (1957) as well as its 2007 Fiat 500 successor.

In developing this new car, Nash had planned planned to call it the Diplomat. This name would have rounded out the Nash family of vehicles; since starting with the 1950 model year, the 600 line was renamed the Statesman, and the Ambassador remained the flagship line. When the managers learned that Dodge had already reserved the Diplomat name for a planned two-door hardtop body style, Nash delved into its past, and resurrected the Rambler name from an 1897 prototype and its first production model, in 1902. Rambler was also one of the popular early American automobile brands. On 22 May 1950, the automaker filed trademarks for the Rambler and also the Statesman names.

The historical context of the Nash Rambler, along with the Nash-Healey and later the Metropolitan, was that U.S. citizens were exposed to and gained experience with the smaller, more efficient compact, and sporty European cars during the Second World War. Nash's CEO had also visited Italy, France, and England to observe the development of small vehicles in those markets. Some of the styling cues for the convertible Rambler came from Italian designs. The new car's input included the approach of more compact cars that came from Nash-Kelvinator having vast markets overseas. This influence is also seen directly in the Pininfarina-designed models. American Motors would later continue to import European design and styling flair to incorporate into its products, such as the Hornet Sportabouts by Gucci, the Javelins by Pierre Cardin, and the Matador coupes by Oleg Cassini.

== Model years ==
=== 1950 ===
1950–1952
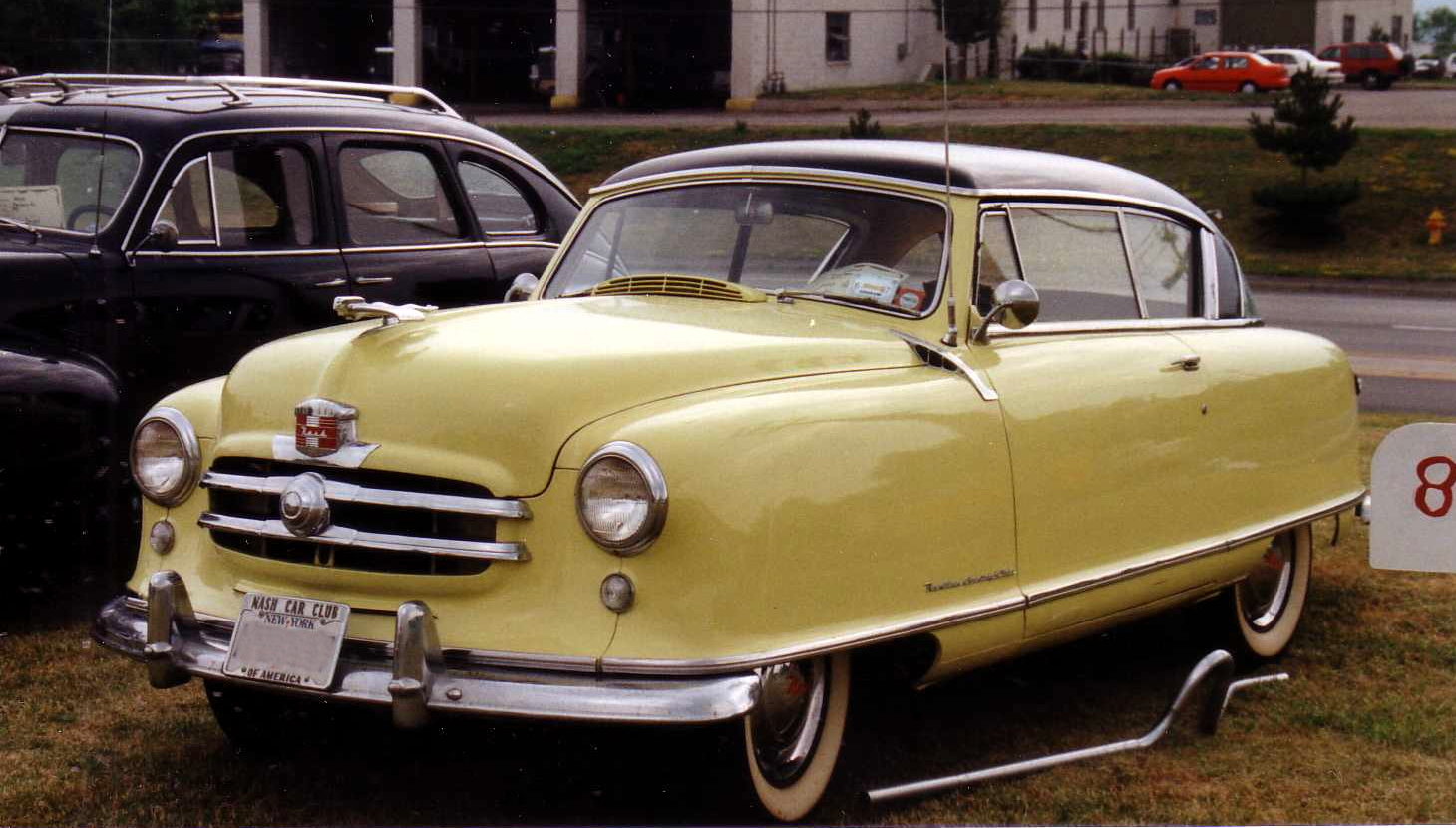
- 1951 Nash "Country Club" 2-door hardtop

Body and chassis
- Body style: 2-door convertible; 2-door hardtop; 2-door sedan; 2-door station wagon; 2-door sedan delivery

Powertrain
- Engine: 172.6 cu in (2.8 L) Rambler L-head I6

Dimensions
- Wheelbase: 100 in (2,540 mm)
- Length: 176 in (4,470 mm)
- Height: 59.75 in (1,518 mm)
- Curb weight: Approximate: 2,500 lb (1,134 kg)

The Nash Rambler was introduced on 13 April 1950, in the middle of the model year. The new Rambler was available only as an upmarket two-door convertible – designated the "Landau". Without the weight of a metal roof and with a low wind resistance body design for the time, the inline 6-cylinder engine could deliver solid performance with fuel economy up to 30 mpg_{‑US} (7.8 L/100 km; 36 mpg_{‑imp}) and even more with the optional automatic overdrive.

Significant factors incorporated into the compact Nash Rambler's marketing mix included making the most of the limited steel supplies during the Korean War and the automaker selecting a strategy for profit maximization from the new Rambler line. Nash offered the Rambler in a single fixed-profile convertible body style, positioning it higher in the marketplace and including more standard features that make the open-top models suitable more for leisure-type use than ordinary transportation. With a base price of $1,808 (equivalent to approximately $24,194, adjusted for), the Nash Rambler was priced slightly lower than the base convertible models from its intended competition. To further increase the value to buyers, the Nash Rambler was well equipped compared to the competition, including whitewall tires, full wheel covers, electric clock, and a pushbutton AM radio as standard equipment options — available only at extra cost on all other cars at that time.

The new Nash Rambler model, "was a smartly styled small car. People also liked its low price and the money-saving economy of its peppy 6-cylinder engine." The small Rambler achieved conquest sales, pulling buyers from the Big Three automakers with a unique selling proposition, unmatched by the larger companies. The abbreviated first year of production saw sales of 9,330 convertibles.

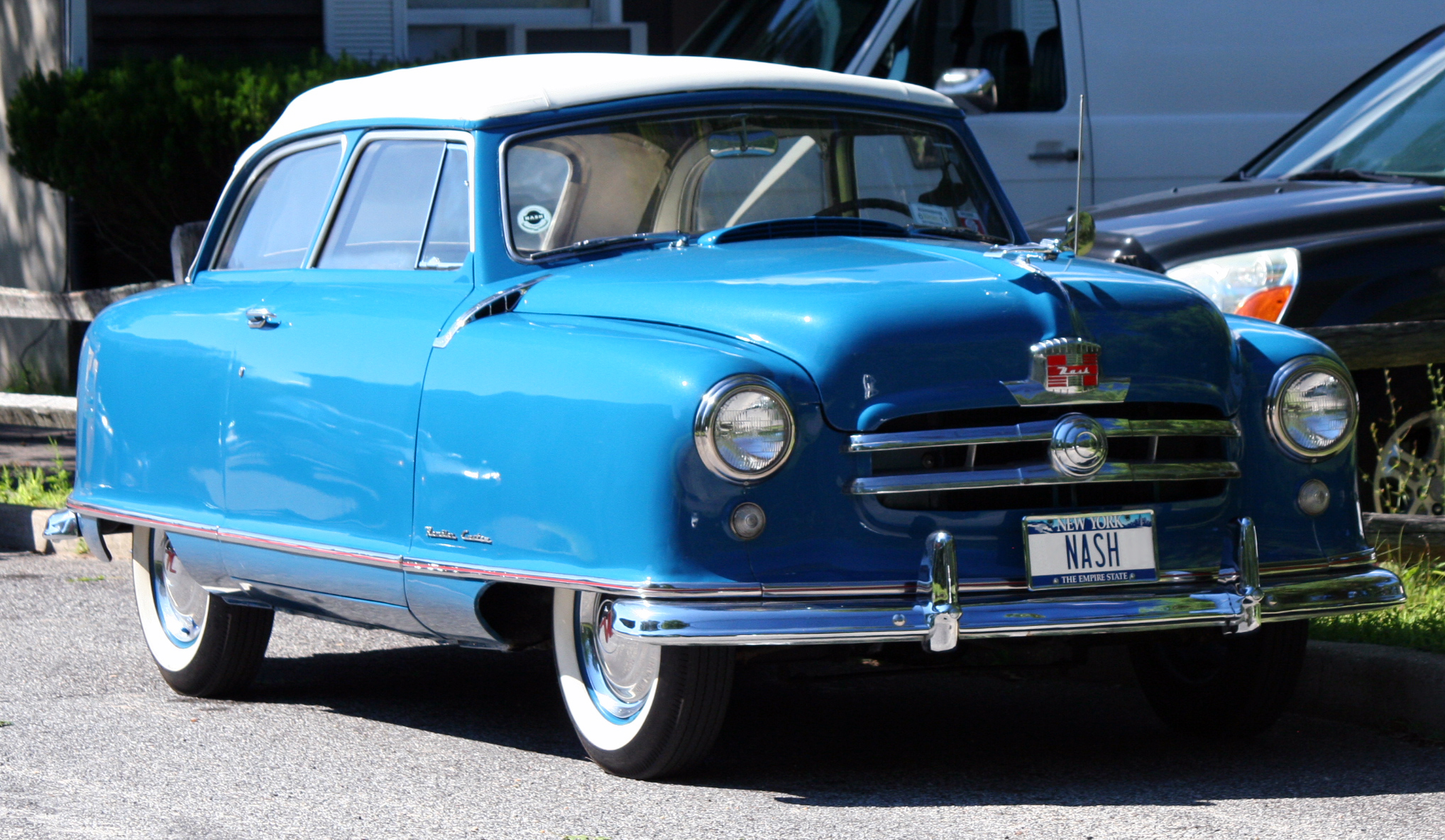
Nash Rambler Custom convertible

=== 1951 ===
In 1951, the Nash Rambler line was enlarged to include a two-door station wagon and a two-door pillarless hardtop – designated the Country Club. Both the hardtop and convertible models included additional safety features.

Two levels of trim were available: Custom and Super.

A car tested by the British magazine The Motor in 1951 had a top speed of 80.9 mph (130 km/h) and could accelerate from 0–60 mph (0–97 km/h) in 21.0 seconds. Fuel consumption of 25.2 mpg_{‑imp} (11.2 L/100 km; 21.0 mpg_{‑US}) was recorded. The test car cost $1,808 in the U.S., but British sales had not at the time started.

A 1951 Nash Rambler convertible was used by Tunku Abdul Rahman in Melaka in 1957 when as Federation of Malaya's first prime minister he declared the country free from British rule.

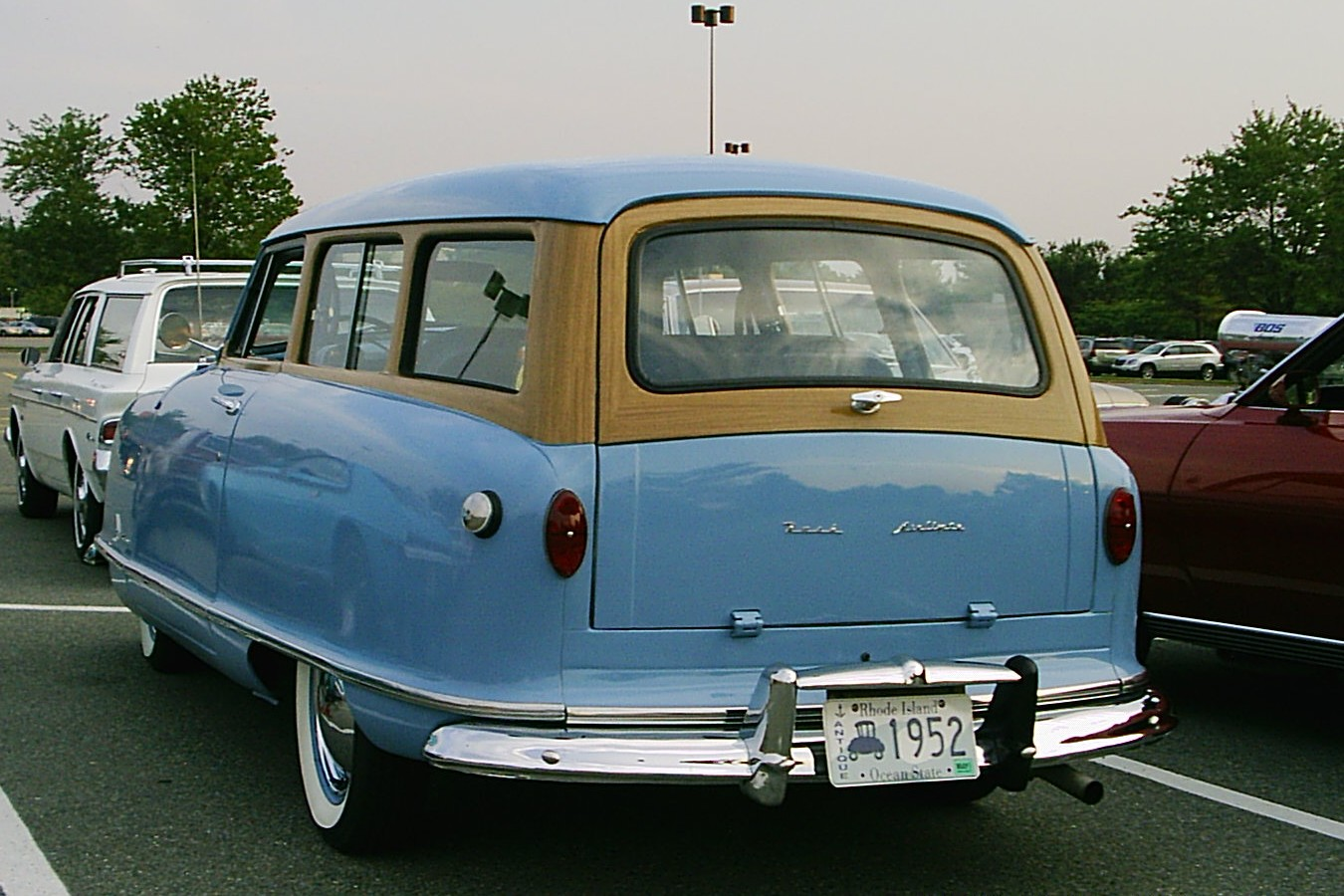
1952 Nash Rambler "Custom Greenbrier" station wagon

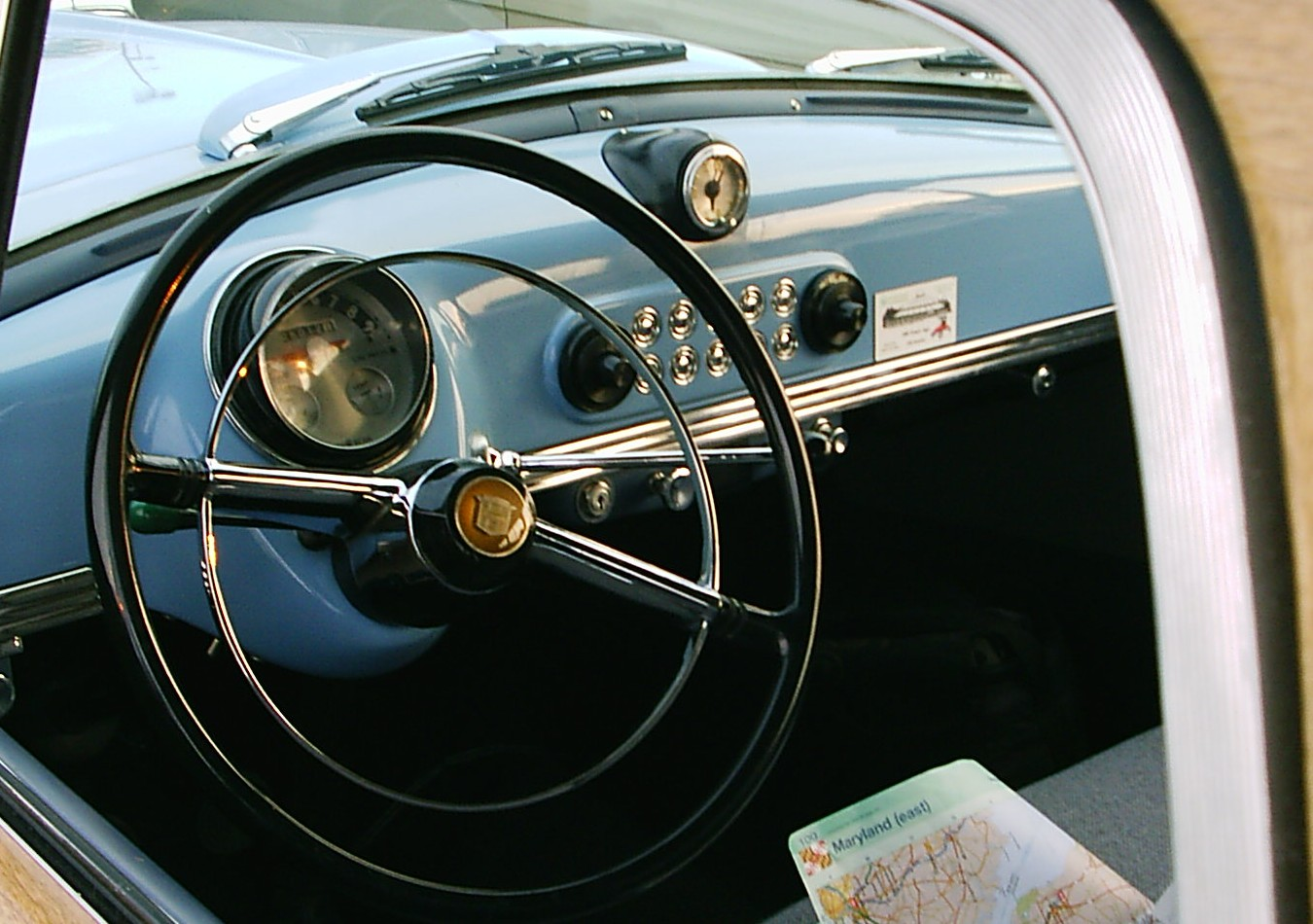
1952 interior

=== 1952 ===
There were no major changes for the 1952 model year. Models included a new Deliveryman 2-door utility wagon for $1,892. The "Custom" models featured Nash's Weather Eye conditioning system and an AM radio as standard equipment. The new Greenbrier station wagons received upgraded trim with two-tone painted exteriors and they were priced at $2,119, the same as the Custom Landau Convertible model.

The 1950–1952 Nash Ramblers "gained instant popularity with buyers who liked its looks, as well as loyalty among customers who appreciated its quality engineering and performance." A total of 53,000 Nash Ramblers were made for the year.

=== 1953 ===
1953–1955
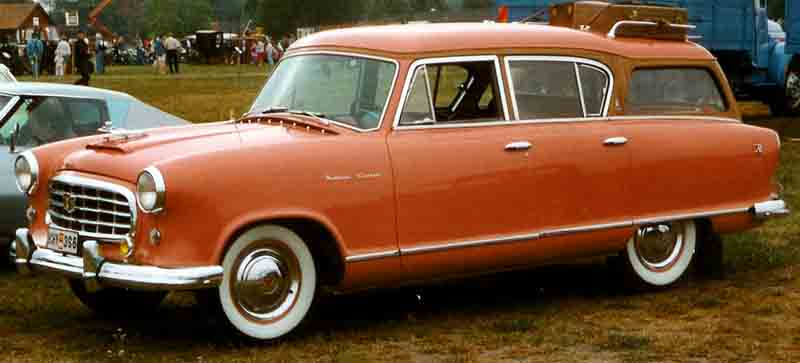
- 1955 Nash Rambler 4-door Cross Country wagon

Body and chassis
- Body style: 2-door convertible; 2-door hardtop; 2-door sedan; 2-door station wagon; 4-door sedan; 4-door station wagon; 2-door sedan delivery

Powertrain
- Engine: 184 cu in (3.0 L) I6 (with manual); 195.6 cu in (3.2 L) I6; (with automatic)

Dimensions
- Wheelbase: 100 in (2,540 mm) all 2-door models; 108 in (2,743 mm) 4-door sedan & wagon
- Length: 176 in (4,470 mm) all 2-door models; 186.4 in (4,735 mm) 4-door sedan & wagon

The Rambler received its first restyling in 1953 and resembled the "senior" Nash models that had received all-new "Airflyte" styling the year before. The new styling was again credited to Italian automobile designer Battista "Pinin" Farina. The hood line was lowered and a new hood ornament, designed by George Petty was optional. The "racy" ornament "was a sexy woman leaning into the future, bust down, and pointing the way."

The standard engines were increased with manual transmission cars receiving a 184 cu in (3.0 L) I6 producing 85 hp (63 kW; 86 PS), while a 90 hp (67 kW; 91 PS) 195.6 cu in (3.2 L) I6 powered cars with the optional "Hydra-Matic" automatic supplied by General Motors. The Custom models added Nash's "Weather Eye" heating and ventilation system, as well as a radio as standard equipment, with the convertible and hardtop versions all getting a continental tire at no extra cost.

The marketing campaign focused on the Nash Rambler as a second family car. Advertisements also featured the wife of Jimmy Stewart and her Country Club 2-door hardtop she described as "a woman's dream-of-a-car come true!" and promoting buyers to spend "one wonderful hour" test driving to discover how "among two-car families – four out of five prefer to drive their Rambler."

A survey of owners of 1953 Ramblers conducted by Popular Mechanics indicated the majority listed their car's economy as the feature they like best. After they had driven a total of 1,500,000 miles (2,400,000 km), owners' complaints included a lack of rear-seat legroom, water leaks, and poor dimmer switch position, but none of the Rambler drivers rated acceleration as unsatisfactory. Fully 29 percent had no complaints and "only four percent of Rambler owners described the car as too small and 67 percent rated their Ramblers as excellent over-all."

Production for the model year was 31,788 and included 9 Deliveryman models in the station wagon body, 15,255 Country Club hardtops, 10,598 Convertible Landaus, 10,600 station wagons (of which 3,536 were in the Greenbrier trim and 7,035 were Customs, with 3M's DI-NOC simulated wood-grain trim), and 1,114 standard wagons.

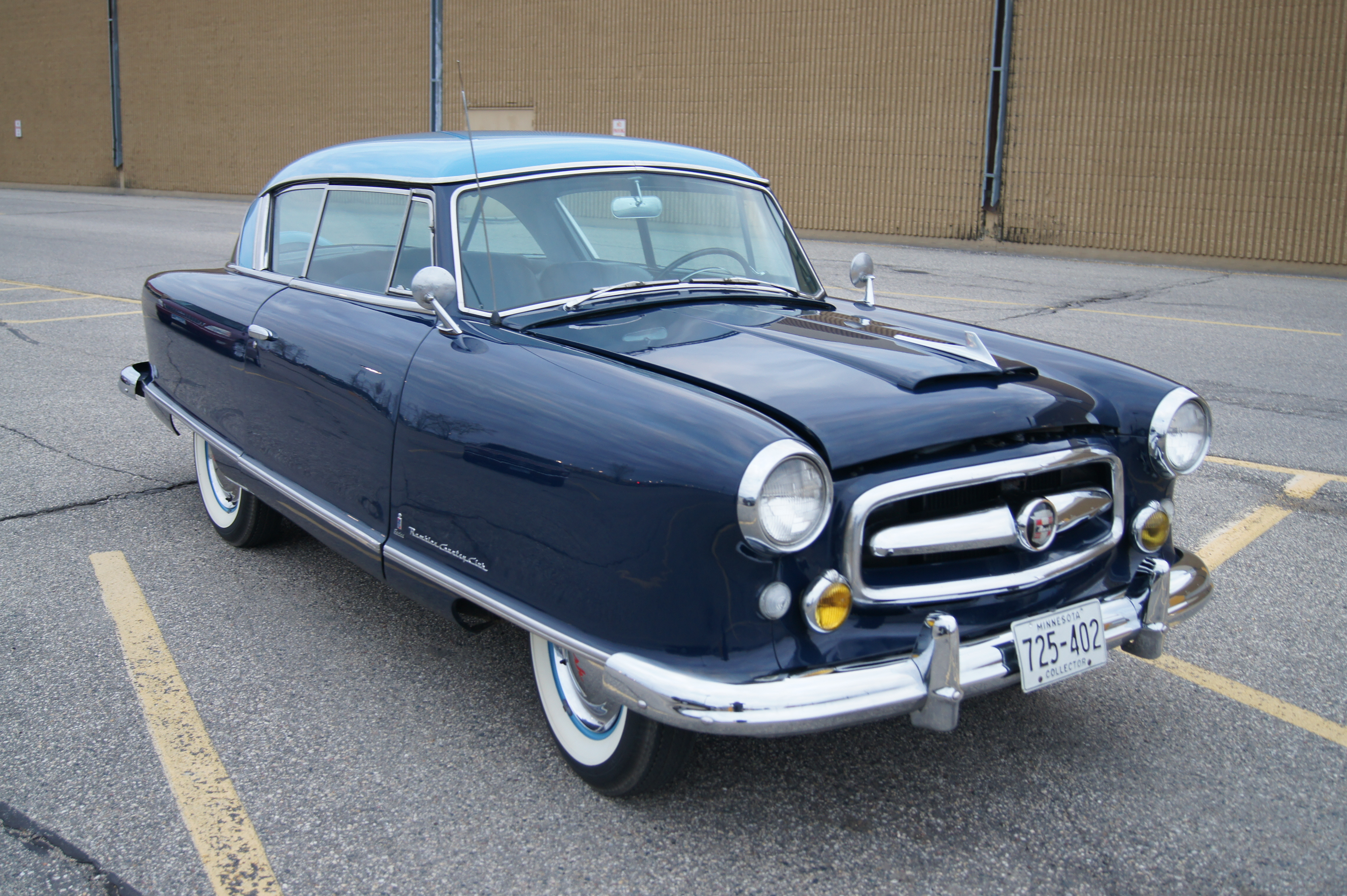
1953 Nash Rambler Country Club

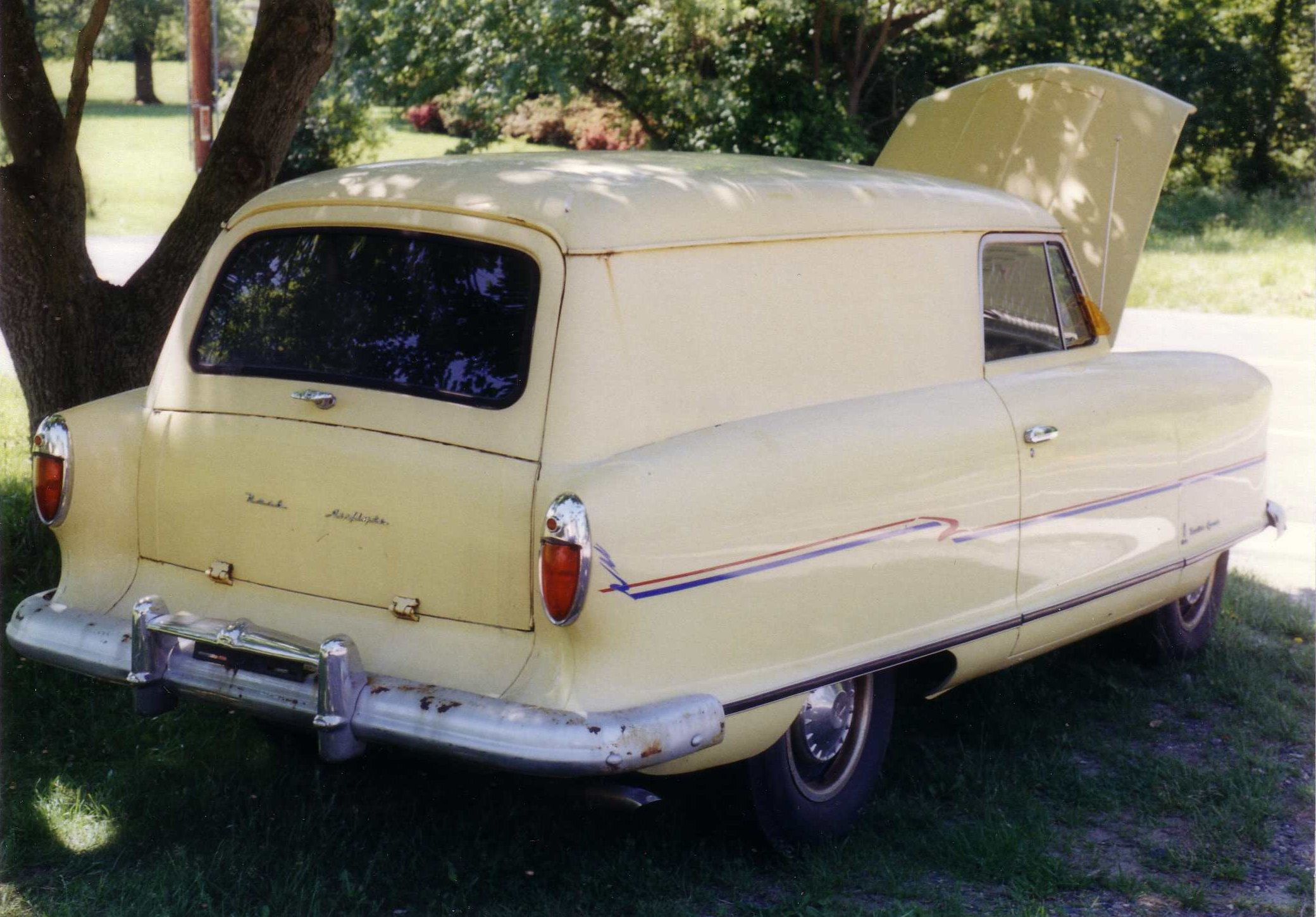
1953 Nash Rambler Deliveryman

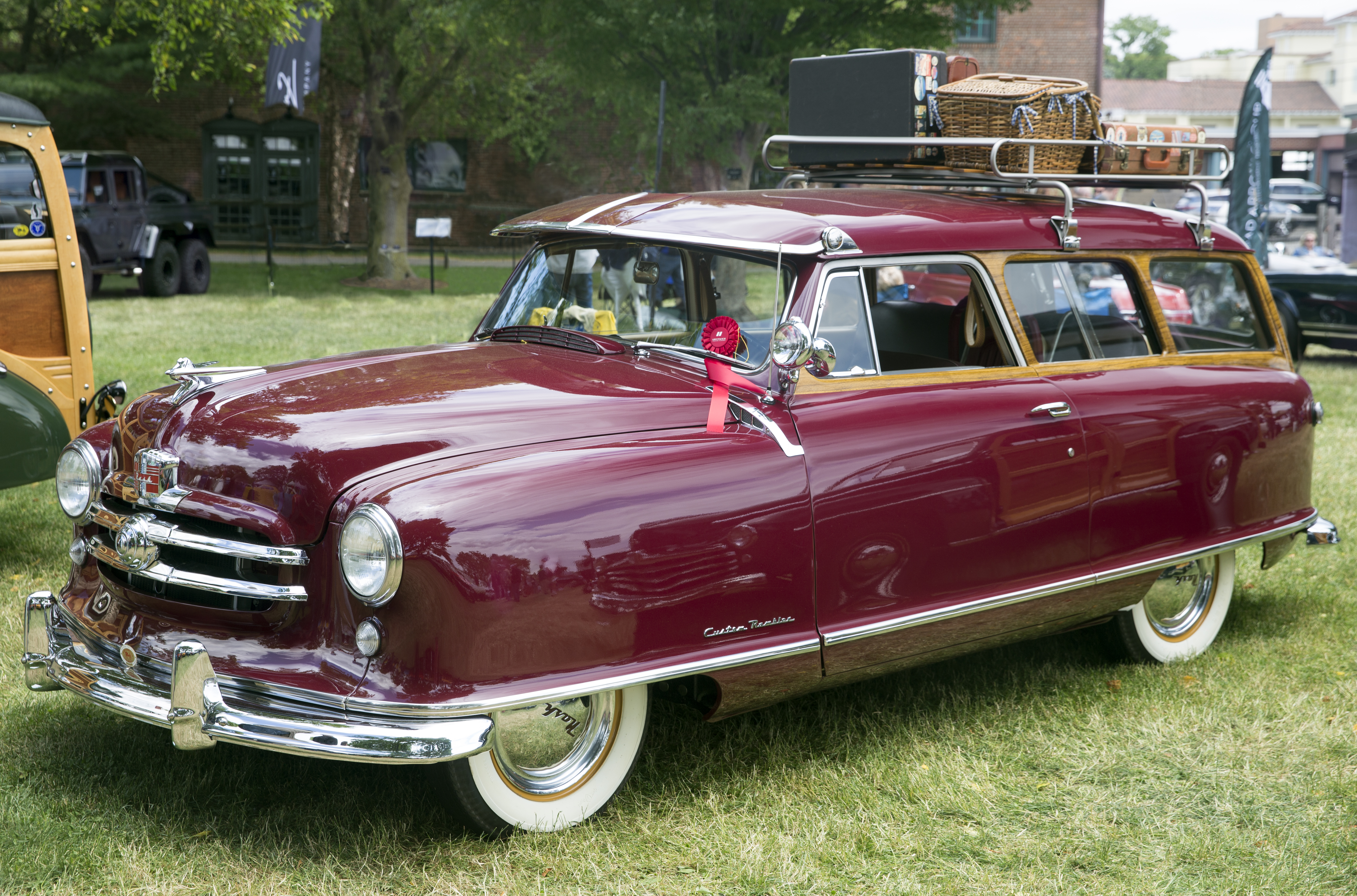
1953 Nash Rambler Custom 2-door Station Wagon

=== 1954 ===
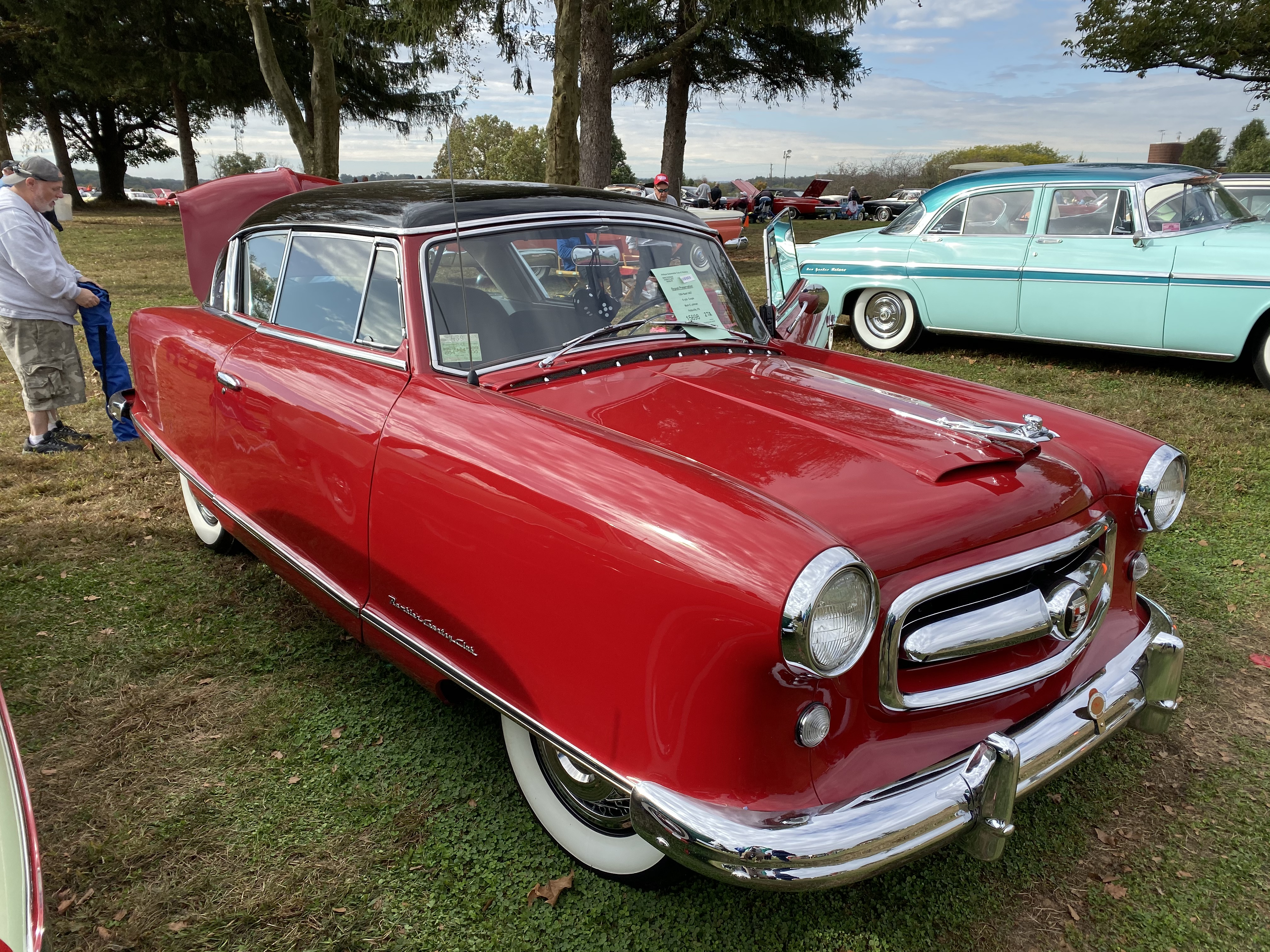
1954 Nash Rambler Custom Country Club 2-door hardtop

After offering only two-door-only models, Nash introduced a four-door sedan and a four-door station wagon in the Nash Rambler line starting with the 1954 model year. This was the automaker's response to demands of larger families for more roomy Ramblers. The four-door body styles rode on a longer, 108 in (2,743 mm) wheelbase. Following the industry practice at the time, the heater and radio were now made optional. Added to the options list was Nash's exclusive integrated automobile air conditioning system, a "very sophisticated setup" for the time incorporated heating, ventilation, and air conditioning in one system that was "priced lower than any other competing system; at $345, it was a remarkable advance."

The four-door Rambler sedan was at first only available in "Custom" trim. The "Country Club" hardtop became available in the lower-priced "Super" trim and without the "Custom" model's standard Continental tire (external spare tire carrier). The 4-door station wagons were designated Cross Country. They featured an unusual roofline that followed the slope of the sedan's roof, then dipped down behind the rear seat area before leveling and continuing rearward. The design by Bill Reddig allowed the use of the same dies to produce door framing for sedans and station wagons, while the dip in the rear portion of the roof included a roof rack as standard equipment to reduce the visual effect of the wagon's lowered roofline.

There was turmoil in the U.S. automobile market as the Ford-Chevy sales war broke out and the two largest domestic automakers cut prices to gain sales volume. This battle decimated the remaining independent automakers in their search for customers. The marketing battle put a squeeze on the much smaller independent automakers, so even though the Nash Rambler economy cars proved popular in the marketplace, they were not particularly profitable for the company.

On 1 May 1954, Nash and Hudson Motor Car Company announced a merger, and the successor corporation was named American Motors Corporation (AMC). Following the merger, Hudson dealers began receiving Ramblers that were badged as Hudson brand cars. The Hudson Ramblers and Nash Ramblers were identical, save for the brand name and minor badging.

=== 1955 ===
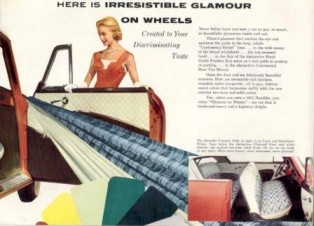
1955 Nash Rambler brochure describing the interiors

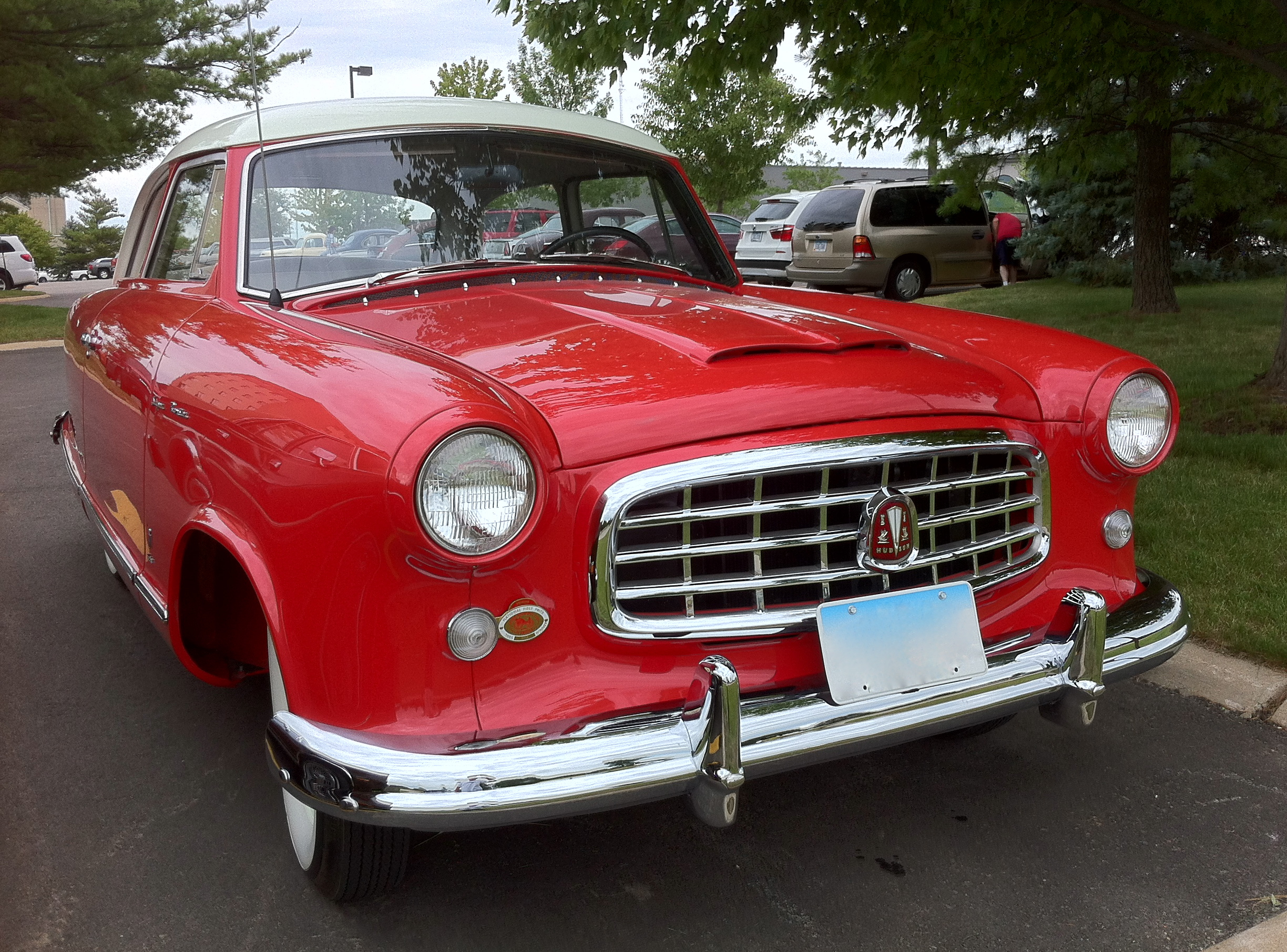
1955 Hudson Rambler Super 2-door

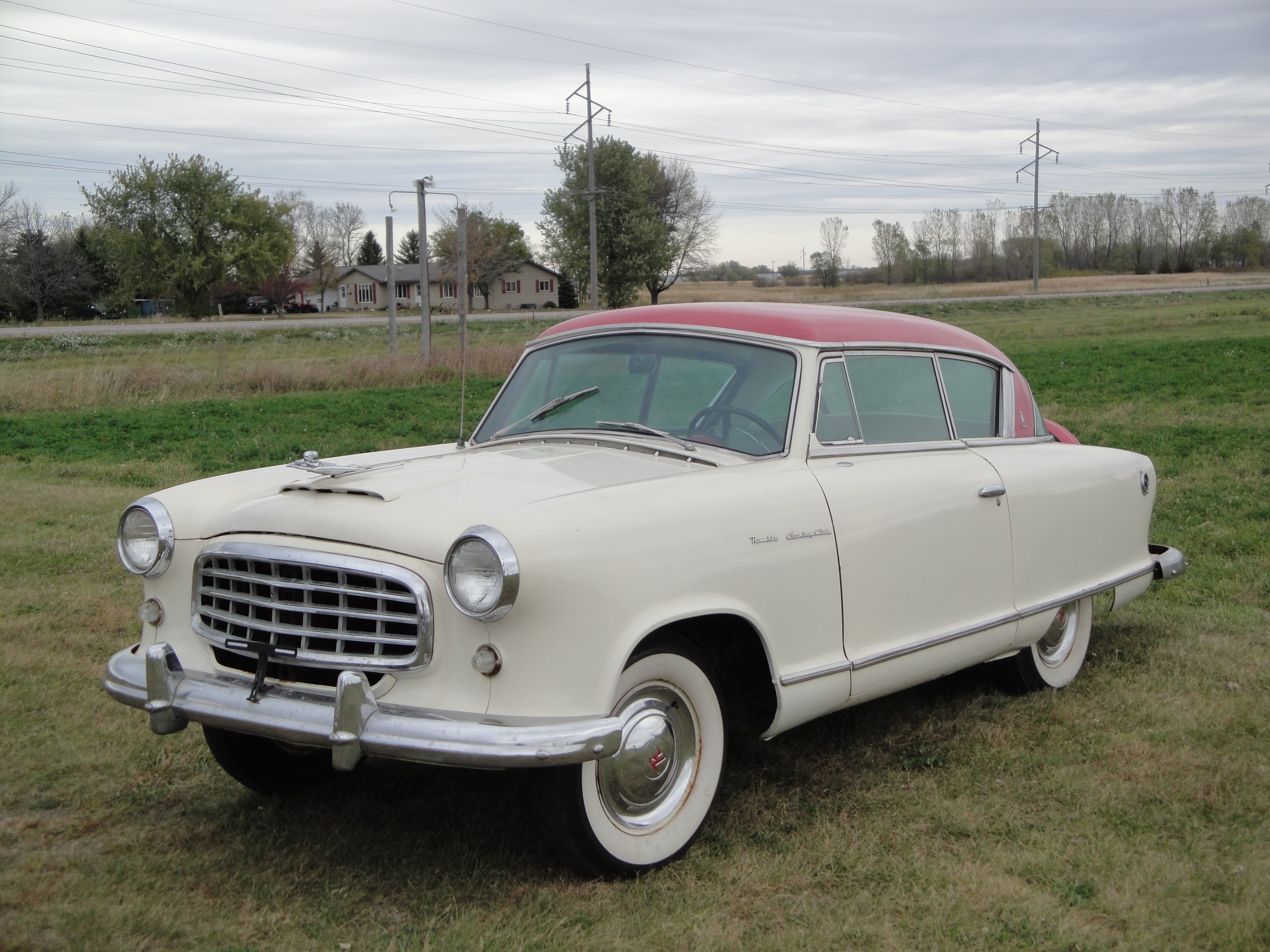
1955 Rambler Country Club

Significantly, Nash revised the front styling for model year 1955, eliminating the front skirts, opening the front wheel wells, dramatically decreasing the turning radius by 6-foot (2 m), and giving the two-door models the smallest turning radius in the industry at 36 ft (11 m). With removal of the front fender skirts, the front track exceeded the rear. Designers Edmund Anderson, Pinin Farina, and Meade Moore had disliked the enclosed front fender favored by George Mason; on his death, "Anderson hastily redesigned the front fenders." Tongue-in-cheek, Popular Science magazine described the altered design for 1955: the "little Rambler loses its pants."

As part of the facelift for 1955, the Rambler's grille was also redesigned with only the center emblem differentiating the cars now sold by both Nash and Hudson dealers. The Rambler was a new model for Hudson dealers and it replaced the compact Hudson Jet.

The Rambler's interior was designed by Helene Rother to also appeal to the feminine eye. American Motors used the tagline, "Created to Your Discriminating Taste," in the car's marketing, highlighting the elegant, stylish, and expensive fabrics that coordinated in color and trim.

Model and trim combinations were again reshuffled with a two-door Suburban and Club two-door sedans available in "Deluxe" or "Super" versions. Four-door sedans and wagons came as Super or Custom models, while a new Deluxe four-door sedan was introduced. The pillarless Country Club hardtop was reduced to only the "Custom" trim, while the convertible model was no longer available.

Fleet sales-only versions included a Deliveryman wagon that was not shown in the regular catalog, as well as another new model, a three-passenger business coupe: a two-door sedan with no rear seat.

Nash sponsored the Disneyland television show on the American Broadcasting Company (ABC) network, which had its inaugural broadcast on 25 October 1955; just five days after Nash presented the new Ramblers in both Nash and Hudson dealerships. The Disney show quickly became one of the top-watched programs in the U.S., thus helping drive AMC showroom traffic.

Nash also continued to emphasize fuel efficiency and economy of operation. A Rambler four-door set a new record for cars with automatic transmissions achieving 27.47 mpg_{‑US} (8.56 L/100 km; 32.99 mpg_{‑imp}) in the 1955 Mobil Economy Run.

The U.S. domestic market was turning to bigger and bigger cars; therefore, prospects for the compact Nash Rambler line were limited and production was discontinued after the 1955 model year.

== Motorsports ==
The smallest car in the 13 July 1951, 400-lap NASCAR sanctioned Short Track Late Model Division race in Lanham, Maryland, was a Nash Rambler Country Club (two-door hardtop). Owned by Williams Nash Motors of Bethesda, Maryland, the car was driven to victory by Tony Bonadies of Bronx, New York. He stayed in the back of the 25-car field on the quarter-mile (0.40 km) track until making a steady move up to the lead position. The Nash Rambler was also the only car to run the entire 100-mile (161 km) race without making a pit stop.

On 18 July 1952, the NASCAR Short Track race at the Lanham Speedway, was 400 laps on a 0.2-mile (0.32 km) paved oval for a total of 80 miles (129 km). Tony Bonadies finished the race in 4th place in a 1952 Nash.

== Replacement ==
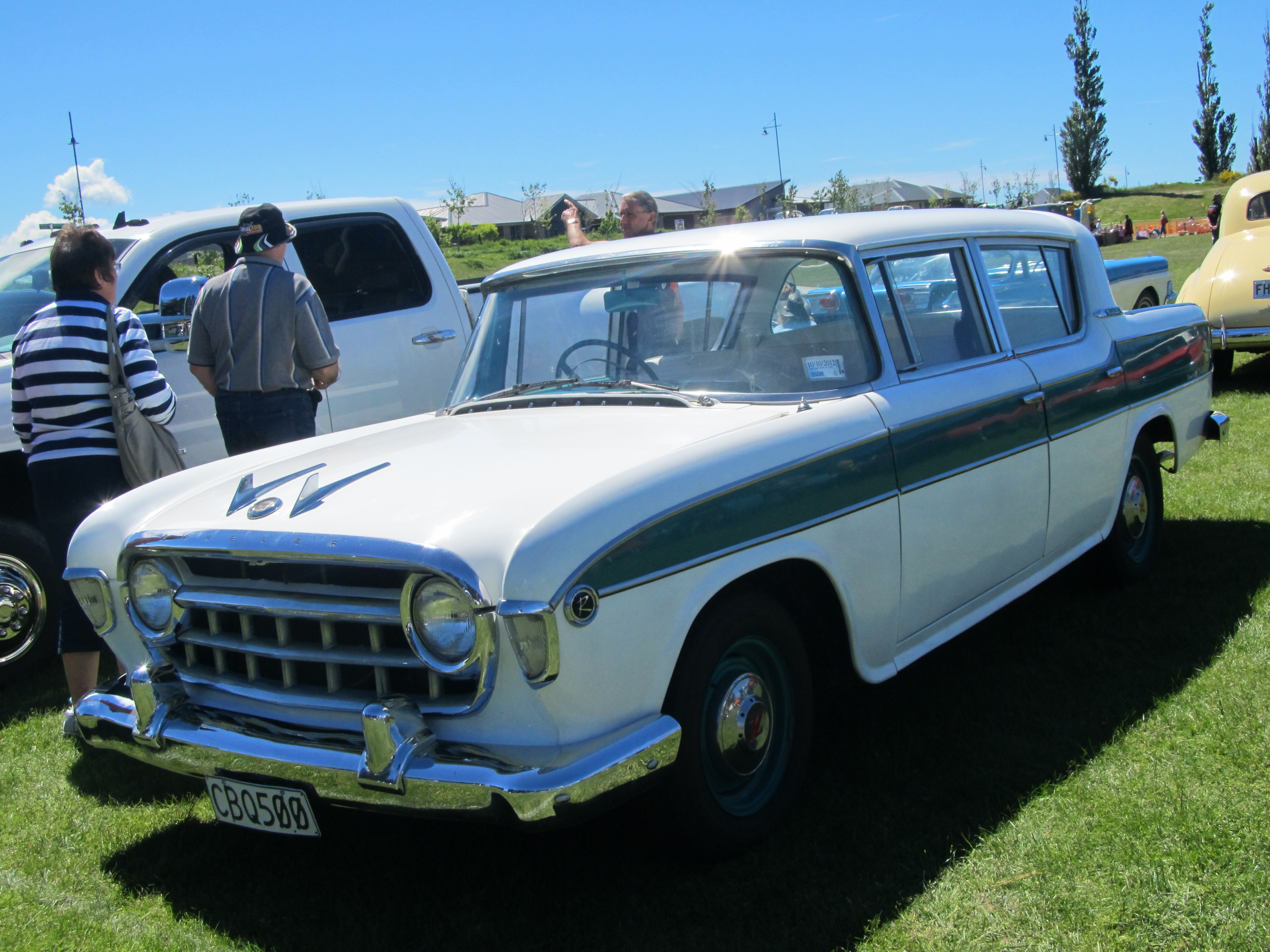
The new compact-sized 1956 Nash Rambler in right-hand drive (New Zealand)

The sales war between Ford and Chevrolet that took place between 1953 and 1954 reduced the market share for the remaining automakers trying to compete against the standard-sized models offered by the domestic Big Three (General Motors, Ford, and Chrysler). American Motors responded to the changing market by focusing development on the 108 in (2,743 mm) wheelbase four-door versions that it had introduced in 1954. Production of the original compact Nash Rambler ended in 1955 as AMC introduced an all-new Rambler for the 1956 model year. These used the 108 in (2,743 mm) wheelbase and became larger cars, but were "compact" compared to ones made by the Big Three. The bigger Rambler models were sold by both Nash and Hudson dealers and they carried respective Nash and Hudson brand logos.

The new for 1956 Rambler was arguably "the most important car American Motors ever built" in that it not only created and defined a new market segment, emphasized the virtues of compact design, but also enabled the automaker to prosper in the post-World War II marketplace that shifted from a seller's to a buyer's market. The new Ramblers came only as four-door models. Along with the usual four-door sedan and the station wagon was a new four-door hardtop sedan, as well as an industry first, a four-door hardtop station wagon. An OHV version of the 195.6 cu in (3.2 L) engine was also introduced for 1956 to replace the L-head version that was used in previous models. The OHV I6 was the only engine available in the 1956 Ramblers, as the new AMC V8s did not appear until the 1957 model year.

== Nash Rambler Palm Beach ==
American Motors' relationship with the Italian designer Battista 'Pinin' Farina as a styling consultant resulted in the 1956 Nash Rambler Palm Beach. All the major mechanical components for the concept car came from a 100 in (2,540 mm) wheelbase Nash Rambler. The only indication of the origin of the show car are the Rambler "R" emblems on the hubcaps.

Influenced by aerodynamic and technical innovations, the Palm Beach was constructed "so that it could be introduced to the market in a short period of time." The fully functional show car was intended as a replacement for the Nash-Healey, but AMC no longer included a sports car in its lineup by 1956.

== Revival (1958-1960) ==
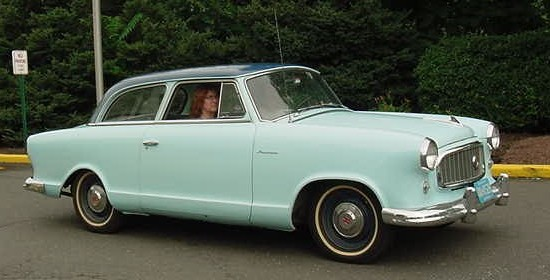
The revived Rambler American

With AMC's focus on economical automobiles, management saw an opportunity with the economic recession of 1958 to revive the small 100 in (2,540 mm) wheelbase Nash Rambler. The automaker had retained the old tooling and the old model would fit between the bigger 108 in (2,743 mm) wheelbase family-sized Ramblers and the imported two-seat 85 in (2,159 mm) wheelbase Nash Metropolitan. This would be a smaller and more efficient alternative to the standard-sized cars that were marketed by the domestic Big Three at that time. The old Nash design was slightly modified and used for AMC's "new" 1958 Rambler American.

== Legacy ==
A book listing the 75 noteworthy American automobiles that made news from 1895 until 1970, documents "the 1950 Nash Rambler was a historic car on two counts: its ancestry and its small size." While other compact-sized cars were introduced by the small independent automakers, such as the Henry J, Hudson Jet, and Willys Aero, only the Rambler survived long enough to establish a real place in automotive history.

Moreover, the compact-sized Nash Rambler automobile evolved into a business strategy for American Motors as the company firmly associated itself with small cars in the U.S. marketplace. In the 1960s, the automaker "prospered on the back of the Nash Rambler, the compact that recalled the name of the vehicle Thomas B. Jeffrey built in 1902 at the Kenosha, Wisconsin factory that continued to be AMC's main production plant."

The Nash Rambler succeeded where others "tried to entice US consumers looking for practical, economical automobiles" during an era "when all Detroit had to offer were pricey, ostentatious behemoths." The Big Three domestic automakers exited the entry-level car market to foreign makes starting in the early 1950s. Nash was the only American manufacturer to get the compact formula right by offering Rambler "well equipped and priced sensibly"; "styling that was fresh, distinctive, and attractive"; and for developing "the original Rambler's run in 1950–55 was that there was a full line of Ramblers in many body styles, including a jaunty convertible."

According to automotive historian Bill Vance, the Nash Ramblers "are not much remembered, but they did provide reliable, economical, and sturdy service." "Nash's reputation for building eminently sensible vehicles means that their products are often overlooked by the modern-day enthusiast."

== In popular culture ==
The Nash Rambler is featured in the 1958 hit song "Beep Beep." The singer, driving a Cadillac, is shocked to see a "little Nash Rambler" apparently trying to drag-race his bigger, stronger car, and keeping up with it. In the end, it turns out the Rambler's driver did not know how to get out of second gear. At the end of 1959, Time magazine reported that the song helped push Rambler to set sales records along with AMC doubling production compared to the previous year.
