= Mobil Economy Run =

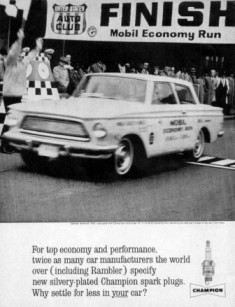
A 1962 magazine advertisement for Champion Spark Plugs (Federal-Mogul) promoting the Mobil Economy Run winner for the year, the Rambler American.

The Mobil Economy Run was an annual event held from 1936 to 1968, except during World War II. It was designed to provide real fuel efficiency numbers during a coast-to-coast test on public roads, with regular traffic and weather conditions. The Mobil Oil Corporation sponsored it, and the United States Auto Club (USAC) sanctioned and operated the competition.

== In the United States ==
The Mobil Economy Run determined the fuel economy or gas mileage potentials of passenger cars under typical driving conditions encountered by average motorists. This contrasts with the current method used by the United States Environmental Protection Agency (EPA) for computing fuel consumption, which involves cars operating on chassis dynamometers in a climate-controlled environment.

To prevent special preparation or modifications to the participating automobiles in the competition, the United States Auto Club purchased the cars from dealerships, inspected them, and, if certified as "stock," sealed their hoods and chassis. The factory gas tank was disconnected so fuel use could be accurately measured by using a special tank mounted in the trunk. Because of the many types of automobiles, the Mobil Economy Run had eight classes based on wheelbase, engine, body size, and price. The leading automakers provided drivers, and in each car was a USAC observer to prevent any deviations and penalize for traffic or speed-limit violations. Women were permitted to participate in the Mobil Economy Run only from 1957.

The event was a marketing contest between the automakers. The objective was the coveted title as the Mobilgas Economy Run winner in each class. However, starting in 1959, entries were judged on an actual miles-per-gallon basis, instead of the ton-mileage formula used previously, which favored bigger, heavier cars. As a result, compact cars became the top mileage champs. In the 47-car field for 1959, a Rambler American was first - averaging 25.2878 miles per US gallon (9.3015 L/100 km; 30.3694 mpg_{‑imp}) - while a Rambler Six was second - with an average of 22.9572 miles per US gallon (10.2458 L/100 km; 27.5704 mpg_{‑imp}) - for the five-day, 1,898-mile (3,055 km) trip from Los Angeles, California to Kansas City, Missouri.

The efficiency of the more compact Rambler models made by American Motors Corporation (AMC) led to their being all but banned from the event. As a result, Ramblers and Studebakers were put in a separate class. This was because the 'Big Three' auto makers (General Motors, Ford, and Chrysler) did not have competitive cars at the time and were trounced in the fuel efficiency rankings until they introduced smaller platforms (GM X platform, Ford Falcon, Chrysler A platform).

Automakers tried to "prepare" their cars to achieve better results. An example was to use lightweight motor oil during the allowable 1,500-mile (2,400 km) "break-in" period that would "promote faster wear and loosen the engines up quickly." Moreover, the factory-supplied drivers were highly trained and experienced to drive in a manner that conserved fuel. An ordinary driver in the same car, over the same course, would be lucky to match the Run's results. The tests only show the "ultimate" economy potential of the cars tested and their relative efficiency of fuel use.

The event received criticism in the form of literary fiction in Jordan Crittenden's book Balloons Are Available. In the novel, a fictional character is hit by an automobile during the event. An excerpt from the novel reads, "'It was terrible,' she says. 'The driver couldn't stop because he was competing in a Mobilgas Economy Run.'"

Over the years, the Mobil Oil Corporation sponsored many Mobil Economy Run events across the country for various car classes and automobile associations for short distances. In 1963, a "day-day" test between Los Angeles and the Grand Canyon eventually evolved into a "six-day" endurance test between Los Angeles and New York City by the United States Auto Club. The last event started in Anaheim, California, on 2 April 1968, but was canceled in Indianapolis on 5 April due to civil disturbances initiated by the assassination of Martin Luther King Jr.

In December 1968, it was announced by Richard F. Tucker, vice president of marketing for Mobil in North America, that the event would be canceled in the United States, citing "changing advertising patterns and changing emphasis in automotive performance as major factors influencing the decision."

== In the United Kingdom ==
Mobil entered the United Kingdom service station market in 1952, as Mobilgas. It copied the annual Economy Run from the United States. However, in the 1970s, the Economy Run was taken over in the UK by Total S.A., but the event was discontinued in the UK after just a few years.

== In Australia ==
In Australia the Mobilgas Economy Run was staged in various years including 1955, 1956, 1958, 1959, 1960 (the fifth running), 1961, and, as the Mobil Economy Run in 1962, 1963, 1964, and 1966 (the tenth running).

== In Italy ==
In Italy, the competition began in 1959 and lasted at least until 1985. Since 1969, it has been organized by Mobil, with FIAT providing the cars. From 1969 to 1984, it was also called Mobil Fiat Economy Run, while in 1985 the name was changed to Lancia Mobil Economy Run.

== In France ==
The competition was also present in France at the end of the 1970s.

== In the claims for a patent ==
The Mobil Economy Run is used to explain the claims made for United States Patent # 3937202 - an "Economy driving aid":

"... The experience obtained by skilled drivers in the Mobil Economy run indicates that for best fuel economy, a car should be operated at nearly constant speed in the range of 30 to 50 mph. Rapid accelerations or decelerations and operation at (or near) full throttle should be avoided. To practice for economy runs, skilled drivers used special instrumentation to determine the operating conditions for best fuel economy. This instrumentation usually included a vacuum gauge to indicate intake manifold vacuum, a special odometer to measure distance traveled to hundredths of a mile, and a burette to measure gasoline usage. However, instrumentation of this type is extremely complex for the normal driver and is additionally quite expensive. ..."

"... It is an objective of this invention to provide a signal to the operator of a variable speed, variable power internal combustion engine when the engine is being accelerated or decelerated too fast, in addition to a signal when the engine is being operated at too high or too low a power output. ..."
