= George W. Mason =

American industrialist (1891-1954)

- George W. Mason during the 1940s
- Born: George Walter Mason; March 12, 1891; Valley City, North Dakota, U.S.
- Died: October 8, 1954 (aged 63); Detroit, Michigan, U.S.
- Education: Engineering and business administration
- Alma mater: University of Michigan
- Occupation: Automobile industry executive
- Employer(s): Kelvinator Corporation; Nash-Kelvinator; American Motors
- Known for: Compact cars
- Notable work: Nash "Airflyte"; Nash Rambler; Nash-Healey; Nash Metropolitan

George Walter Mason (March 12, 1891 – October 8, 1954) was an American industrialist. During his career Mason served as the chairman and CEO of the Kelvinator Corporation (1928–1937), chairman and CEO of the Nash-Kelvinator Corporation (1937–1954), and chairman and CEO of American Motors Corporation (1954).

== Early life and education ==
Mason was born in Valley City, North Dakota, to Norwegian-American parents. Mason received his education at the University of Michigan where he designed a specific course for engineering students that combined three years of engineering and a final year in business administration.

Mason had worked for local garages in his youth and upon receiving his degree from Michigan, he accepted a position with Studebaker. Mason changed employers several times before entering military service during World War I. In 1921, Mason secured a position with Walter P. Chrysler at Maxwell-Chalmers, which Chrysler had reorganized and would use to develop Chrysler brand automobiles.

From Maxwell-Chalmers, Mason went to Copeland Products of Detroit in 1926 before becoming the president of the Kelvinator Corporation, a leader in the emerging electric refrigeration industry. Under Mason, Kelvinator quadrupled its profits and became second only to General Motors Frigidaire product line in home refrigeration sales despite the effects of the Great Depression.

== Career ==
=== Nash Motors ===
When Charles W. Nash, founder of Nash Motors, began looking for his successor, he turned to Mason upon the recommendation of Walter Chrysler. Mason initially rebuffed Nash's offer; however, when Nash asked what it would take to bring Mason over to Nash, Mason stated that he would only take the position if Kelvinator was included in the deal. Nash saw merit in this idea; General Motors owned Frigidaire, Borg-Warner owned Norge Appliance, and Chrysler also operated its air conditioning division, Airtemp. Nash and Mason came to terms, and the deal was announced in November 1936. The two firms merged to form Nash-Kelvinator Corporation with Mason as its CEO. By 1940, Mason continued to grow Kelvinator's market share and returned Nash to profitable status.

Continuing Charles Nash's decades of success by building cars "embodying honest worth ... [at] a price level which held out possibilities of a very wide market." Mason began exploring the possibilities of aerodynamics for automobile designs and the use of wind tunnel tests during World War II. Nash's chief of engineering, Nils Erik Wahlberg, worked with Theodore (Ted) Ulrich in the development of Nash's all-new and radically styled 1949 Airflyte models. This was a comprehensive adoption of aerodynamic principles in a low-priced mass-produced post-war automobile. The Airflyte's design extended its body over the car's front wheels, and these enshrouded front wheels remained a Nash hallmark through the 1954 model year.

Mason was a large and gregarious man, standing well over six feet (183 cm) tall and weighing over 300 pounds (136 kg). Despite his large physical size, he was fascinated with small cars, especially the concept of a small, inexpensive car, and Nash's marketing and strategic management. As a result, the automaker introduced three compact car lines:

- Nash Rambler – Mason's vision for a small, inexpensive compact car was changed in light of raw goods shortages, so Mason directed the car to emerge not as a stripped-down economy model, but as an upmarket compact sedan-convertible.
- Nash-Healey – the first American sports car after the Great Depression was developed with partners in Great Britain and Italy.
- Nash Metropolitan – a subcompact car built in cooperation with Great Britain's Austin Motors.

However, General Motors and Ford Motor Company were locked in a battle for market supremacy that started in 1945 when Ford's new president, Henry Ford II, had a burning desire to make his company number one again. By 1953, all of the independent automobile manufacturers were also feeling the after effects of Henry Ford's plan to dump tens of thousands of vehicles into the market at discounted prices to try and wrestle the top automotive manufacturing title from GM. General Motors responded by doing the same. With the market flooded by inexpensive cars, Studebaker, Packard, Willys, Hudson, Kaiser Motors, and Nash were all unable to sell their vehicles at loss leader prices to keep up with Ford and GM. The "frantic 1953–54 Ford/GM price war" devastated the remaining "independent" automakers.

== Legacy with AMC ==
The smaller automakers responded to their shrinking market shares by conducting formal and informal merger talks. Willys and Kaiser merged in 1953. Mason brought together Nash and the Hudson Motor Car Company to cut costs and strengthen their sales organizations to meet the intense competition from the Big Three. This merger occurred on May 1, 1954 to form American Motors Corporation (AMC). At the same time, he tried to bring Studebaker and Packard into AMC. He had informal discussions with James J. Nance of Packard to outline his strategic vision for competing with the Big Three. An agreement was reached for parts-sharing arrangements between AMC and Packard and the new 320 cu in (5.2 L) Packard V8 engine and Packard's Ultramatic automatic transmission would be used in the 1955 Nash Ambassador and Hudson Hornet models. In July 1954, Packard acquired Studebaker.

Within months after the formation of AMC, George Mason died on October 8, 1954, at age 63 of acute pancreatitis and pneumonia in Detroit, Michigan, and was buried in White Chapel Memorial Cemetery. Mason's protégé, AMC vice president George W. Romney, succeeded Mason as chairman and CEO. One of Romney's first acts was to stop rumors that there were additional merger talks between AMC and Studebaker-Packard Corporation or any automakers. According to Mason's obituary in Time magazine, had AMC and Studebaker-Packard joined, it would have resulted in the second largest automaker in the world, behind General Motors.

== Legacy in conservation ==
Following his death it was disclosed that Mason, a former president of Ducks Unlimited, had left a gift to the Michigan Department of Natural Resources consisting of 1,500 acres (6.1 km^{2}) land with 14 miles (23 km) of shoreline along the Au Sable River. The gift was contingent that the area be used as a permanent game preserve, that no part shall ever be sold by the state, and that no camping be allowed in the area for 25 years. The Michigan DNR has continued to uphold the no camping restriction within the Mason tract. In accordance with Mason's wishes, the tract remains free of all development with the exception of a simple log chapel that was constructed on the property by the Mason family in 1960.

== See also ==
- Nash Motors
- Nash-Kelvinator Corporation
- American Motors Corporation

== Notes ==
Business positions
| Preceded by Charles W. Nash | Chairman and CEO of Nash Motors and American Motors; 1936–1954 | Succeeded by George W. Romney |
