= Nash Motors =

Defunct American motor vehicle manufacturer

Coordinates: 42.5842°N 87.8424°W

- Industry: Automobile
- Founded: April 11, 1916; 110 years ago
- Defunct: February 23, 1954; 72 years ago
- Fate: Merged
- Successor: Nash-Kelvinator; American Motors Corporation
- Headquarters: Kenosha, Wisconsin, United States
- Key people: Charles W. Nash, Nils Erik Wahlberg
- Products: Vehicles

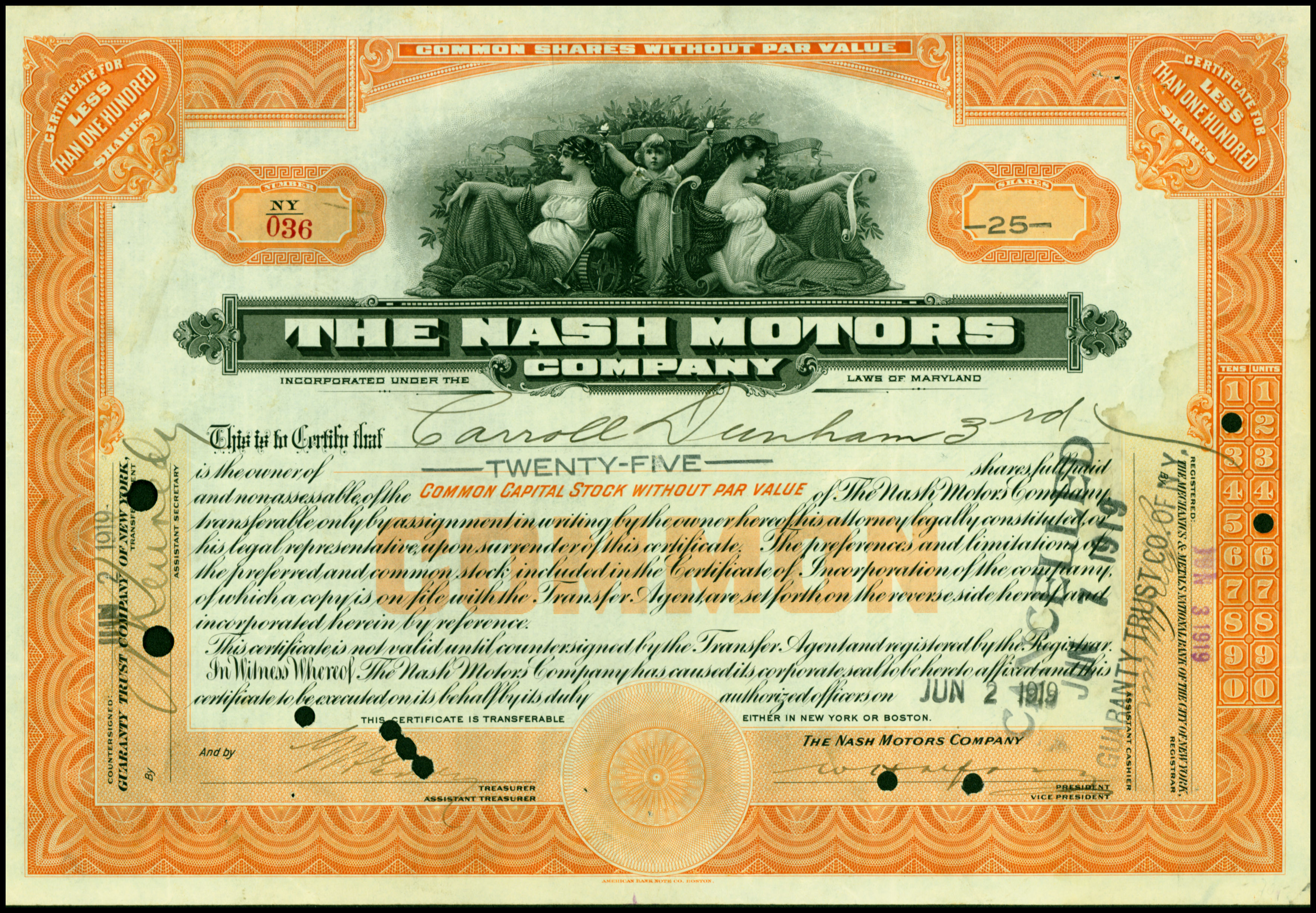
Share of the Nash Motors Company, issued 2 June 1919

Nash Motors Company was an American automobile manufacturer based in Kenosha, Wisconsin from 1916 until 1937. From 1937 through 1954, Nash Motors was the automotive division of Nash-Kelvinator. As sales of smaller firms declined after 1950 in the wake of the domestic Big Three automakers’ (General Motors, Ford, and Chrysler) advantages in production, distribution, and revenue, Nash merged with Hudson Motors to form American Motors Corporation (AMC). Nash automobile production continued from 1954 through 1957 under AMC.

Innovations by Nash included the introduction of an automobile heating and ventilation system in 1938 that is still used today, unibody construction in 1941, seat belts in 1950, a U.S.-built compact car in 1950, and an early muscle car in 1957.

== History ==
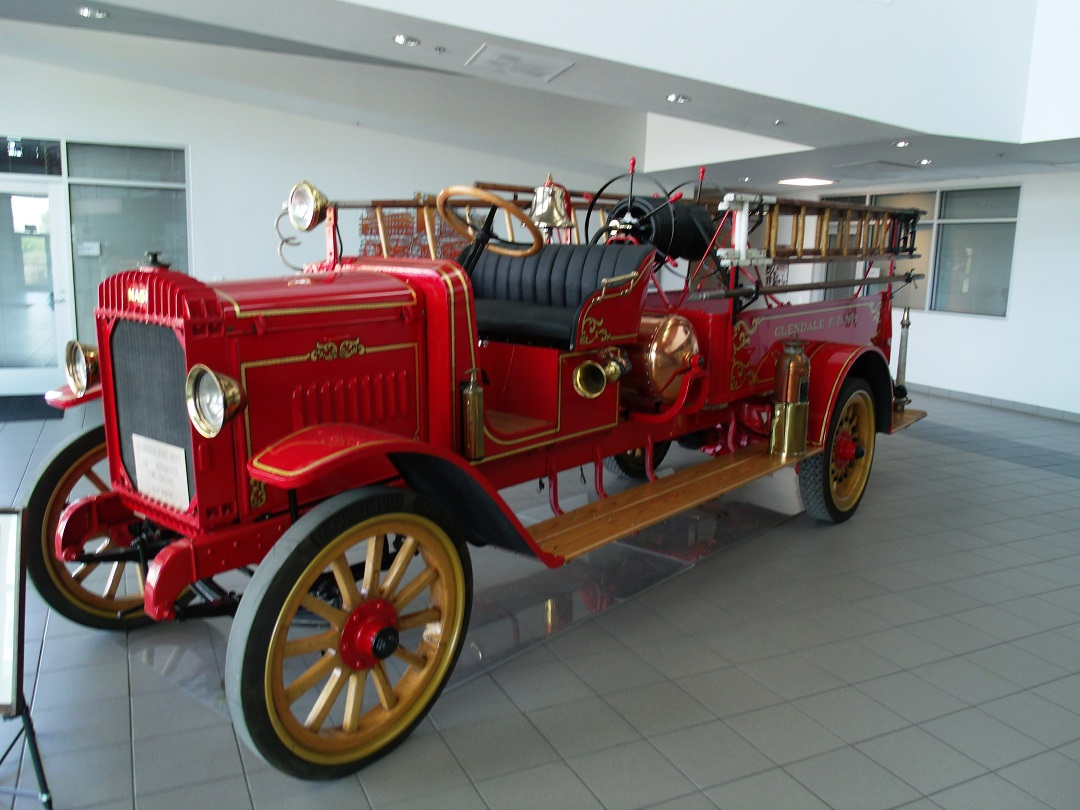
1917 Nash Fire Truck Model 3017

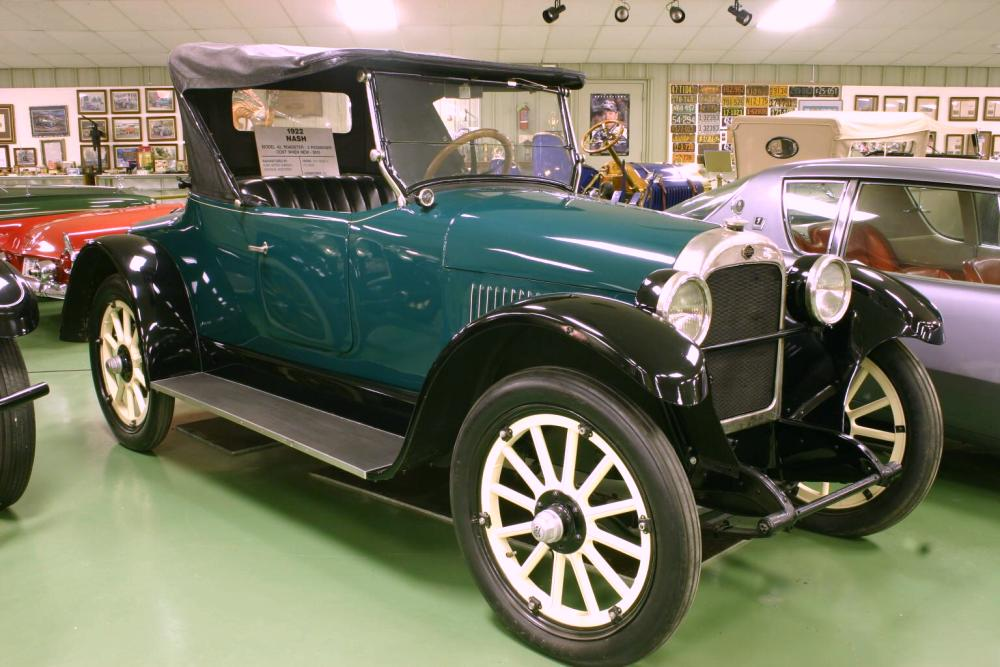
1922 Nash Roadster Model 42

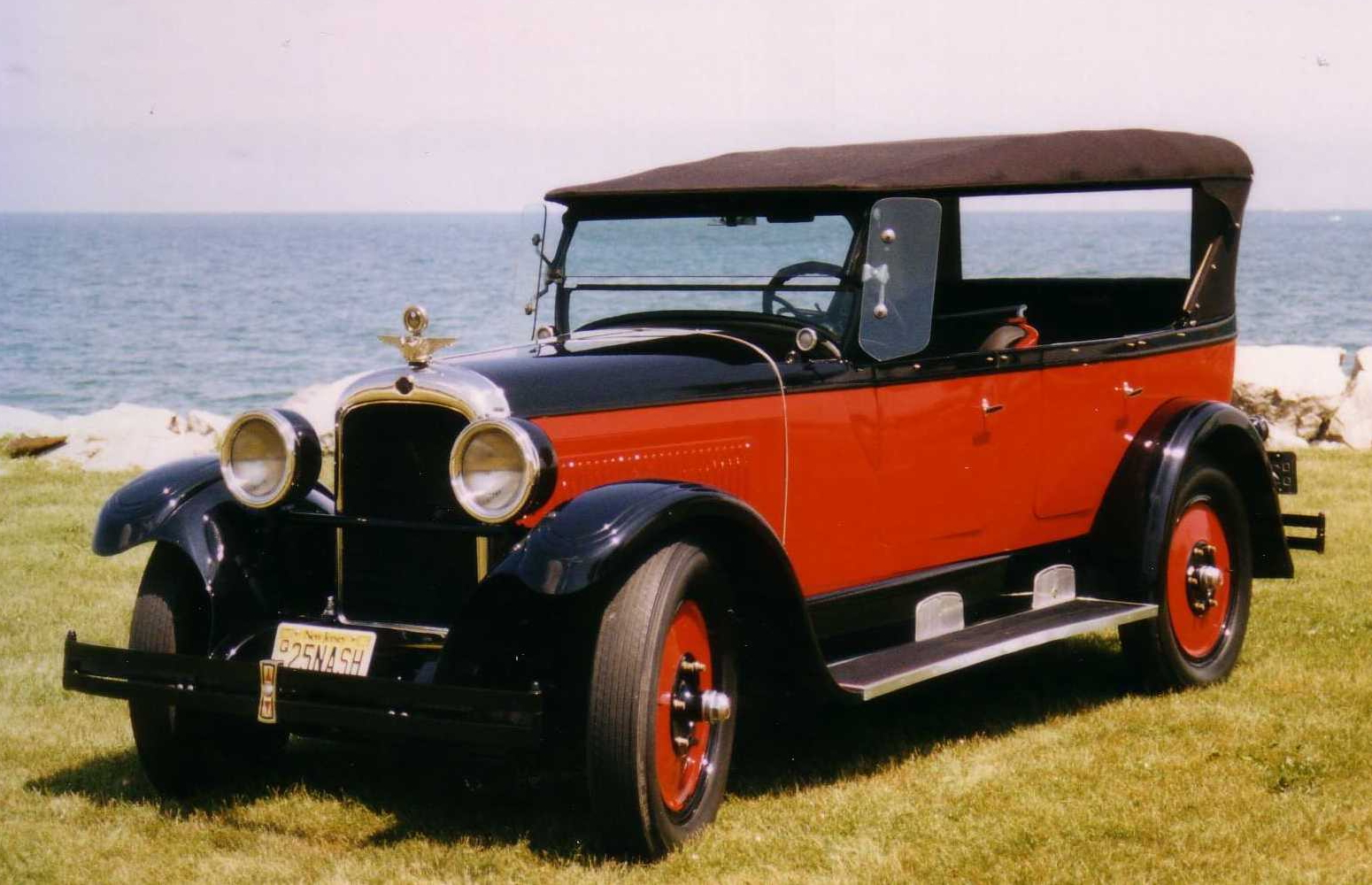
1925 Nash

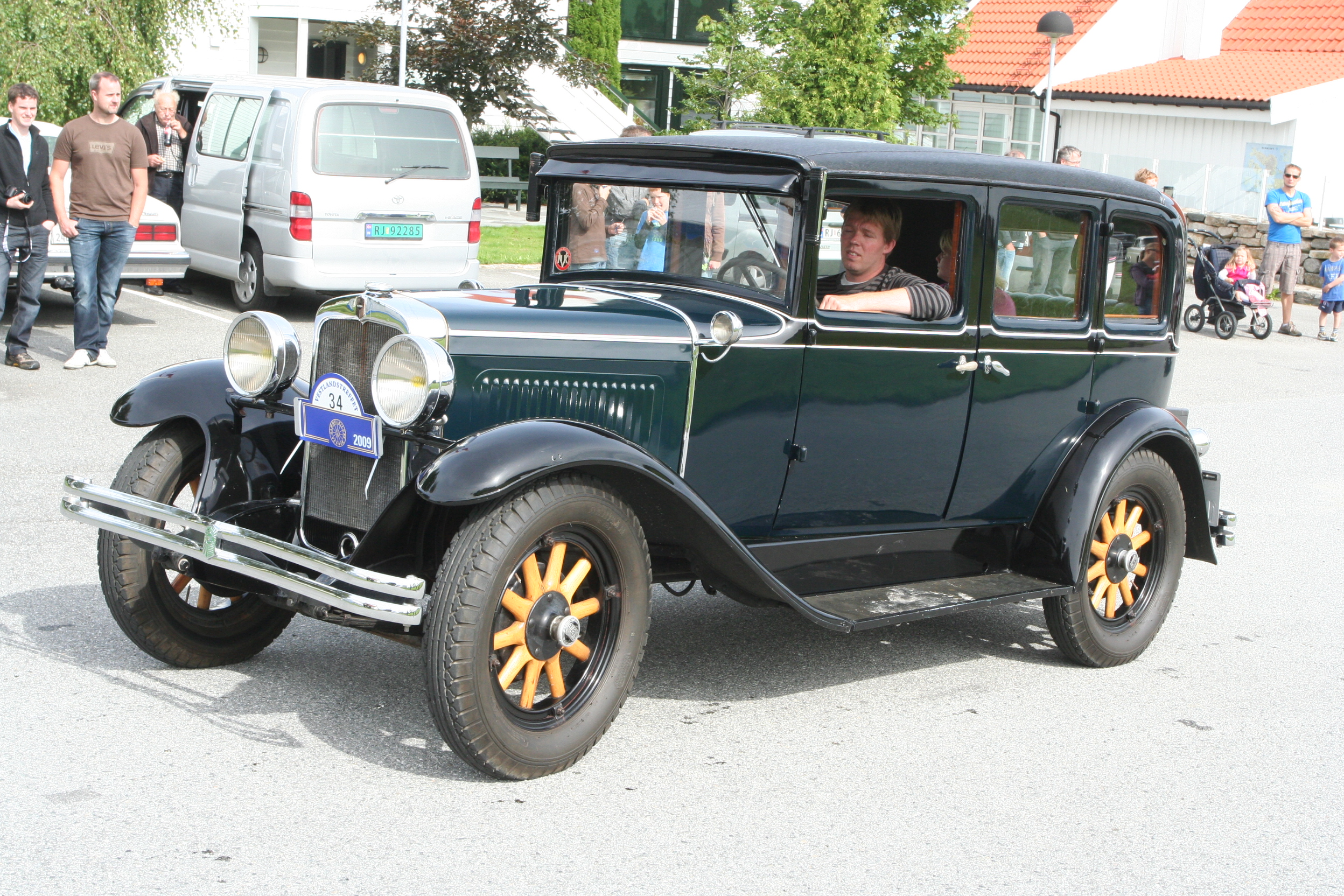
1929 Nash 400

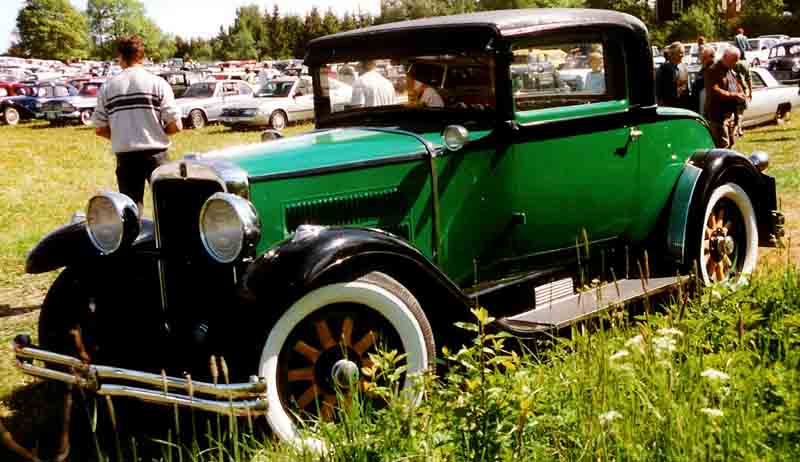
Nash Special Six Series 430 Coupé 1929

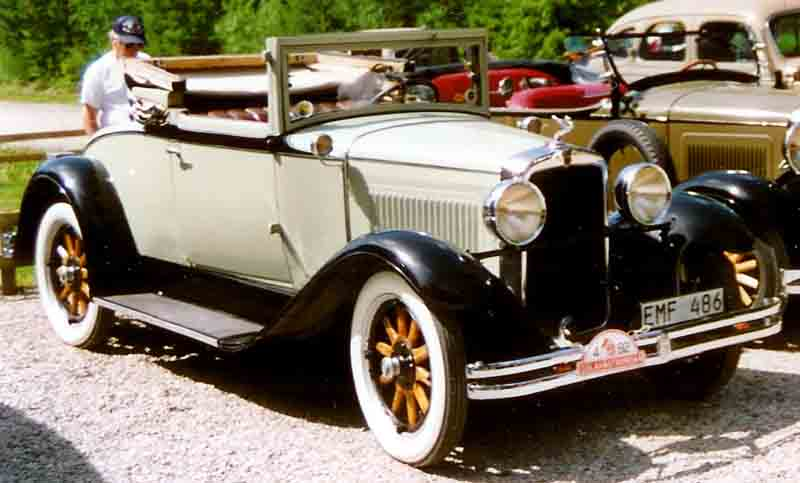
Nash Standard Six Series 422 Convertible Coupé 1929

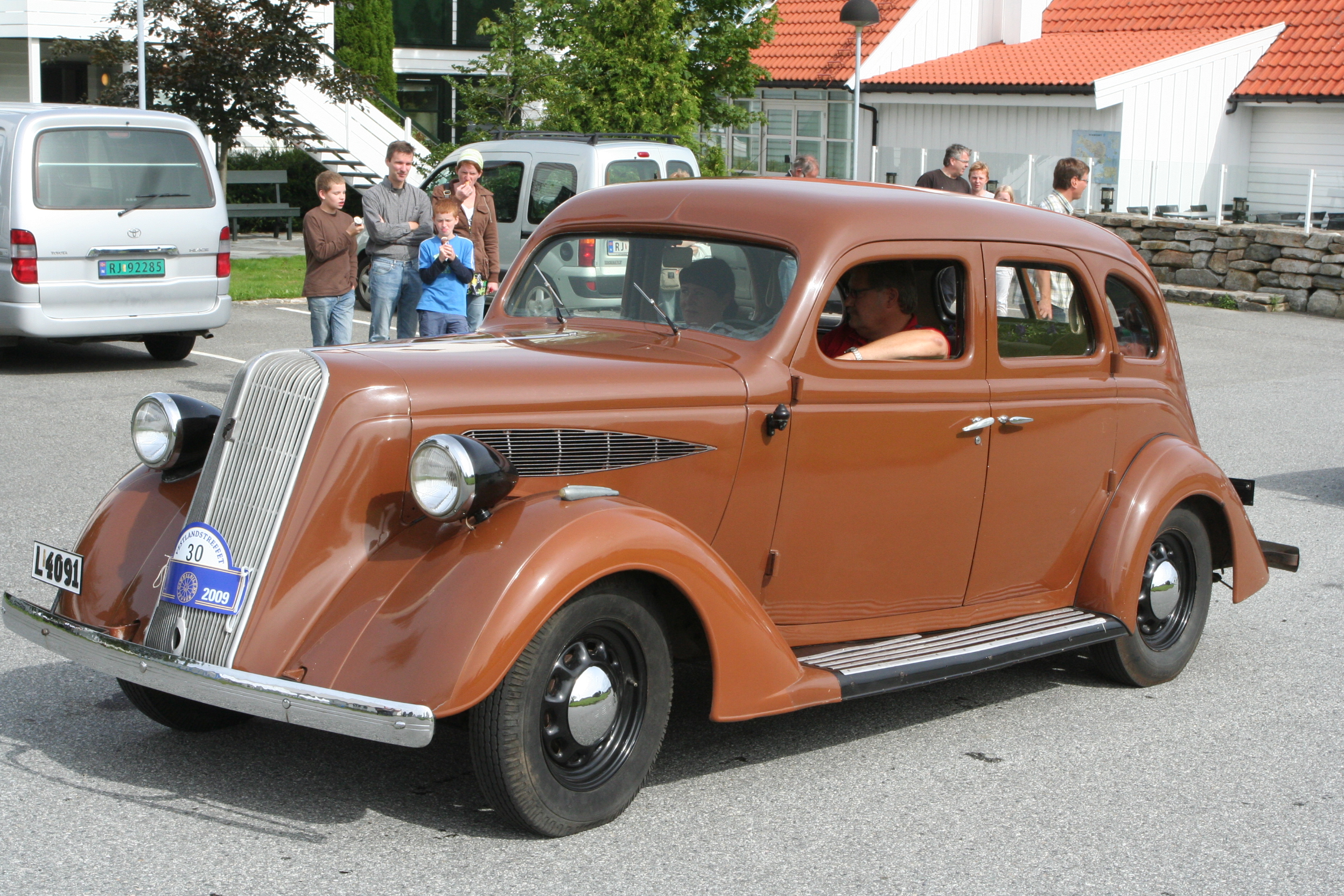
1936 Nash 400 de Luxe

Nash Motors was founded in 1916 by former General Motors president Charles W. Nash, who acquired the Thomas B. Jeffery Company. Jeffery's best-known automobile was the Rambler whose mass production from a plant in Kenosha began in 1902.

The 1917 Nash Model 671 was the first vehicle produced to bear the name of the new company's founder. Sales for 1918 were 10,283 units. More models were added in 1919, and sales rose to 27,081.

Number of motor vehicles produced by Nash Motors:

Year	Production	
1917	12,179	
1918	21,019	
1919	29,841	
1920	40,984	
1921	20,841	
1922	40,458	
1923	56,569	
1924	53,135	
1925	93,397	
1926	137,376	
1948	118,621	
1949	142,592	
1950	167,869	
1951	101,438	
1952	99,086	
1953	93,504	
1954	29,371	production under AMC
1955	51,315	↑
1956	17,841	↑
1957	3,561	↑

The decades of success enjoyed by Nash were said to be due to its focus on building cars "embodying honest worth [at] a price level which held out possibilities of a very wide market."

The four-wheel drive Jeffery Quad truck became an important product for Nash. Approximately 11,500 Quads were built between 1913 and 1919. They served to move material during World War I under severe conditions. The Quad used Mehul differentials with half-shafts mounted above the load-bearing dead axles to drive the hubs through hub-reduction gearing. In addition, it featured four-wheel steering. The Quad achieved the reputation of being the best four-wheel drive truck produced in the country. The newly formed Nash Motors became the largest producer of four-wheel drives. By 1918, capacity constraints at Nash meant the Paige-Detroit Motor Car Company began to assemble the Nash Quad under license and Nash patents. Nash became the leading producer of military trucks by the end of World War I. After the War ended, surplus Quads were used as heavy work trucks in fields such as construction and logging.

Charles Nash convinced the chief engineer of GM's Oakland Division, Finnish-born Nils Erik Wahlberg, to move to Nash's new company. The first Nash engine introduced in 1917 by Wahlberg had overhead valves, which Nash had learned about while working for Buick. Wahlberg is also credited with helping design the flow-through ventilation used since then in nearly every motor vehicle.

Introduced in 1938, Nash's Weather Eye directed fresh, outside air into the car's fan-boosted, filtered ventilation system, where it was warmed (or cooled), and then removed through rearward placed vents. The process also helped to reduce humidity and equalize the slight pressure differential between the outside and inside of a moving vehicle.

Another unique feature of Nash cars was the unequal wheel tracks. The front wheels were set slightly narrower than the rear, thus adding stability and improving cornering. Wahlberg was also an early proponent of wind tunnel testing for vehicles and, during World War II, worked with Theodore (Ted) Ulrich in the development of Nash's radically styled Airflyte models.

Nash's slogan from the late 1920s and 1930s was "Give the customer more than he has paid for," and the cars lived up to it. Innovations included a straight-eight engine with overhead valves, twin spark plugs, and nine crankshaft bearings in 1930. The 1932 Ambassador Eight had synchromesh transmissions and free wheeling, automatic centralized chassis lubrication, a worm-drive rear end, and its suspension was adjustable inside the car. A longtime proponent of automotive safety, Nash was among the early mid- and low-priced cars that offered four-wheel brakes.

The Nash was a success among consumers, which meant for the company, "selling for a long time has been 100% a production problem... month after month, all the cars that could be produced were sold before they left the factory floor."

== Development of the Ajax ==
For the 1925 model year, Nash introduced the entry-level marque Ajax. The Ajax was produced in the newly acquired Mitchell Motor Car Company plant in Racine, Wisconsin. Mitchell was the manufacturer of Mitchell-brand automobiles between 1903 and 1923. Sales of Ajax automobiles, while quite respectable, were disappointing. It was believed that the same car would sell better if it were called a Nash. Thus, the Ajax became the "Nash Light Six" in June 1926, and sales improved as expected.

In an unusual move, Nash Motors offered all Ajax owners a kit to "convert" their Ajax into a Nash Light Six. This kit, supplied at no charge, included a set of new hubcaps, a radiator badge, and all other parts necessary to change the identity of an Ajax into that of a Nash Light Six. This was done to protect Ajax owners from the inevitable drop in resale value when the Ajax marque was discontinued. In this way, Nash Motors showed high value for its customers' satisfaction and well-being. Most Ajax owners took advantage of this move, and "unconverted" Ajax cars are rare today.

== Acquisition of LaFayette ==
Nash was the principal stockholder in LaFayette Motors, a company started in Indianapolis, Indiana in 1920. It later moved to Milwaukee, Wisconsin, and became the producer of a large, powerful, and expensive luxury car. Other significant stockholders were Charles W. Nash and his friends and business associates. However, the LaFayette cars did not sell well.

In 1924, Nash absorbed LaFayette and converted its plant to produce Ajax automobiles. The LaFayette marque was reintroduced in 1934 as a lower-priced companion to Nash. LaFayette ceased to be an independent marque with the introduction of the 1937 models. From 1937 through 1940, the Nash LaFayette was the lowest-priced model, replaced by the new unibody Nash 600 for the 1941 model year.

== Era of George Mason and Nash Kelvinator ==
Before retiring, Charles Nash chose Kelvinator Corporation head George W. Mason to succeed him. Mason accepted, but placed one condition on the job: Nash would acquire controlling interest in Kelvinator, which at the time was the leading manufacturer of high-end refrigerators and kitchen appliances in the United States. As of 4 January 1937, the resulting company was known as Nash-Kelvinator. As a brand name, Nash continued representing automobiles for the merged firm. This was the largest merger of companies in two different industries until then.

In 1938, Nash introduced an optional conditioned air heating/ventilating system, an outcome of the expertise shared between Kelvinator and Nash. This was the first hot-water car heater to draw fresh air from outside the car and is the basis of all modern internal combustion engine car heaters in use today. Also in 1938, Nash, along with other car manufacturers Studebaker and Graham, offered vacuum-controlled shifting, an early approach to removing the gearshift from the front floorboards. Automobiles equipped with the Automatic Vacuum Shift (supplied by the Evans Products Company) had a small gear selector lever mounted on the dashboard, immediately below the radio controls.

In 1936, Nash introduced the "Bed-In-A-Car" feature, which converted the car's interior into a sleeping compartment. The rear seatbacks were hinged to go up, allowing the back seat cushion to be propped up into a level position. This also created an opening between the passenger compartment and the trunk. Two adults could sleep in the car with their legs and feet in the trunk and their heads and shoulders on the rear seat cushions. In 1949, this arrangement was modified so that fully reclining front seatbacks created a sleeping area within the passenger compartment. In 1950, these reclining seatbacks were made to lock into several intermediate positions. Nash soon called these "Airliner Reclining Seats".

In 1939, Nash added a thermostat to its "Conditioned Air System", and thus the famous Nash Weather Eye heater was introduced. The 1939 and 1940 Nash streamlined cars were designed by George Walker and Associates and freelance body stylist Don Mortrude. They were available in three series - LaFayette, Ambassador Six, and Ambassador Eight. For the 1940 model cars, Nash introduced independent coil spring front suspension and sealed beam headlights.

Introduced for the 1941 model year, the Nash 600 was the first mass-produced unibody construction automobile made in the United States. Its lighter weight compared to body-on-frame automobiles and lower air drag helped it to achieve excellent fuel economy for its day. The "600" model designation is said to have been derived from overdrive-equipped examples of this car's ability to travel 600 miles (966 km) on a 20-US-gallon (75.7 L; 16.7 imp gal) tank of gasoline. It would achieve 30 miles per US gallon (7.8 L/100 km; 36 mpg_{‑imp}). The 600 models used an unusual steering/front suspension system with extremely long kingpins. Inadequate lubrication became a problem for these systems, commonly resulting in premature failures. The design of the cars was improved by new front ends, upholstery, and chrome trim from 1942 through 1948. The larger Ambassador models shared the same bodies with the 600 but placed this unibody structure on top of a conventional frame, resulting in a robust design.

Post-World War II passenger car production resumed on 27 October 1945, with an Ambassador sedan first off the assembly line. There were a few changes from the 1942 models. The extended, slimmer upper grille bars and a projecting center section on the lower grille were most noticeable. The 600 models featured a conventional front suspension and steering system. Postwar Nashes were six-cylinder only; eight-cylinder engines did not return. The large Ambassador engine thus was the seven main bearing, overhead-valve, 234-cubic-inch (3.83 L), six-cylinder developing 112 bhp (84 kW; 114 PS).

Nash was considering the potential of offering a pickup truck and developed a prototype built on the existing chassis with a modified 600 front end and cab along with an outsourced cargo bed. For the 1946 model year, Nash introduced the Suburban model that used wood framing and panels on the body. It was similar to the Chrysler Town and Country and Ford Sportsman models. Suburbans were continued in 1947 and 1948, with 1,000 built over the three years. In 1948, the Ambassador convertible returned with 1,000 made.

== Introduction of the Nash Airflyte ==
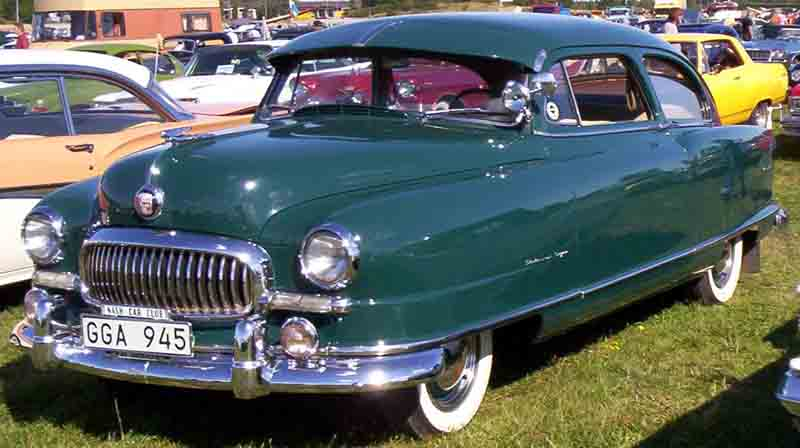
Nash Statesman 2-Door Sedan 1951

The Nash shield, as it appeared on cars of the 1940s and 1950s

The Nash-Kelvinator Corporation entered the post-war era with the intention of differentiating itself through engineering and design. The first step was the introduction of the advanced 1949 Nash Airflyte, the first all-new design from the company after World War II. Under Nash's vice president of engineering, Nils Erik Wahlberg, the Airflyte models featured a distinctive, aerodynamic body—developed through wind tunnel testing. Their smooth, pontoon-like body was unique with enclosed front fenders, a styling choice conceived both for drag reduction and to enhance the rigidity of Nash's unibody construction. This was a "radically aerodynamic" format, inspired by sketches prepared for Nash in 1943 by independent designers Ted Pietsch and Bob Koto. The distinctive appearance is often characterized to that of an inverted bathtub. The radical rounded and smooth design offered class-leading interior room, despite being 6 inches (152 mm) lower than predecessor models. The "cutting-edge aerodynamics" of the all-new Nash design were judged to be the most "alarming" in the industry since the Chrysler Airflow. The cars were assembled at Nash factories in Kenosha, Wisconsin, and in El Segundo, California. The El Segundo property was sold and has been re-purposed as the Boeing Satellite Development Center, immediately south of Los Angeles International Airport, on Nash Street.

Nash's Airflyte models were notable for using a one-piece curved safety glass windshield and offering coil springs on all four wheels. Furthermore, in 1949, Nash pioneered automotive safety by becoming the first American car to offer seatbelts as a factory option. However, consumer demand was virtually nonexistent at the time, leading many buyers to have dealers remove them. There was "heated debate despite increasing scientific research" about their value and the option was "met with insurmountable sales resistance" with Nash reporting that after one year "only 1,000 had been used" by customers.

Due to its enclosed front fenders, Nash automobiles had a larger turning radius than most other cars. The 600 models featured a 112-inch (2,800 mm) wheelbase while the Ambassador models extended to 121 inches (3,073 mm). Both shared the same bodies. Coil springs were used on all four wheels. Both models offered Three trim lines: Super, Super Special, and the top-line Custom. Power was provided by an 82-horsepower (61 kW), 176-cubic-inch (2.88 L) flathead I6 cylinder in the 600 and a 112-horsepower (84 kW) OHV, 234-cubic-inch (3.83 L) I6 in the Ambassador.

The few changes for the 1950 Airflytes included a wider rear window, concealed fuel filler cap, and an enhanced dashboard. Ambassadors offered a GM Hydramatic automatic transmission option. The 600 models were renamed the "Statesman". A five-position "Airliner" reclining front passenger seatback was optional for both models. The stroke on the Statesman engine was increased by 1/4 in (6.4 mm), resulting in 186 cubic inches (3.05 L) and 85 hp (63 kW). The Ambassador received a new cylinder head, which increased power to 115 hp (86 kW).

== The compact Nash Rambler ==
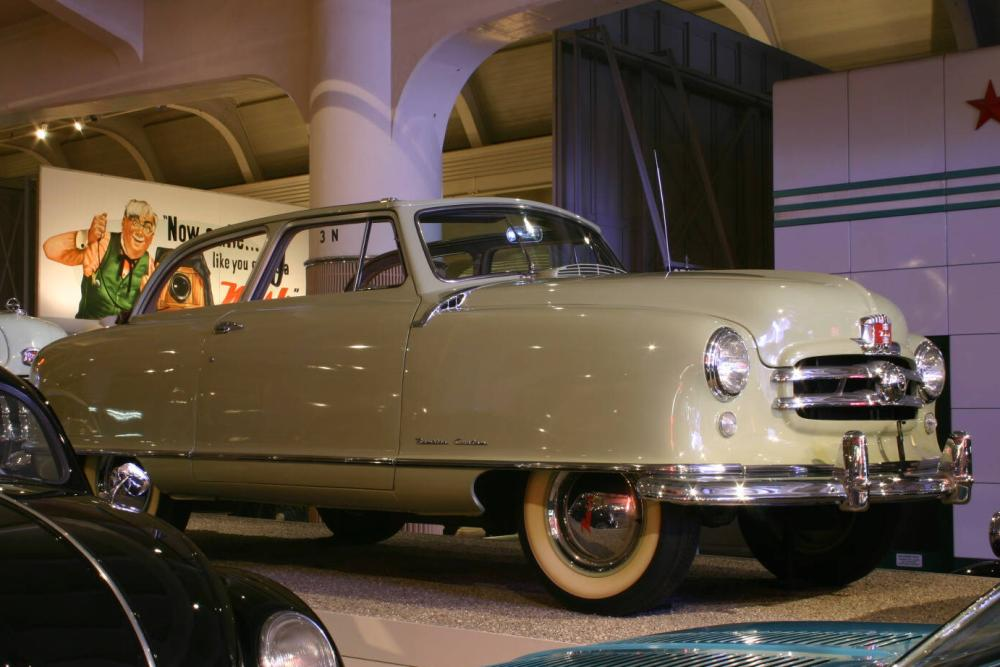
Nash Rambler Convertible "Landau" Coupe, c.1950, fixed profile convertible with retracting roof and rigid doors, the featured car of Lois Lane of the series Adventures of Superman

The introduction of the Nash Rambler in 1950 marked a crucial and highly successful strategic shift for the automaker into the expanding small car market segment. George W. Mason spearheaded this move, recognizing that to compete effectively against the popular standard established models (Ford, Chevrolet, and Plymouth) marketed by the domestic "Big Three" automakers, Nash needed a fundamentally different product. Mason identified the core issue that had hindered previous small car entries: simple affordability was not enough. He insisted the new car "also had to be big enough to appeal to families as their primary car". The Rambler was engineered to be significantly smaller and lighter than contemporary models, allowing for greater production efficiency and better fuel economy, while still comfortably accommodating five passengers. This approach led to a significant marketing breakthrough in the marketplace. The Rambler was not sold as a cheap economy vehicle, but rather as a highly featured, premium-oriented compact.

Nash established the compact segment by employing the Rambler's size and its upscale standard equipment. Moreover, it debuted as a convertible, further strengthening its unique selling proposition. The Nash Rambler become widely regarded as one of the first successful modern small cars in the U.S. market, preceding the domestic compact offerings from rival manufacturers by several years and establishing the template for the segment that would grow during the 1950s and 1960s.

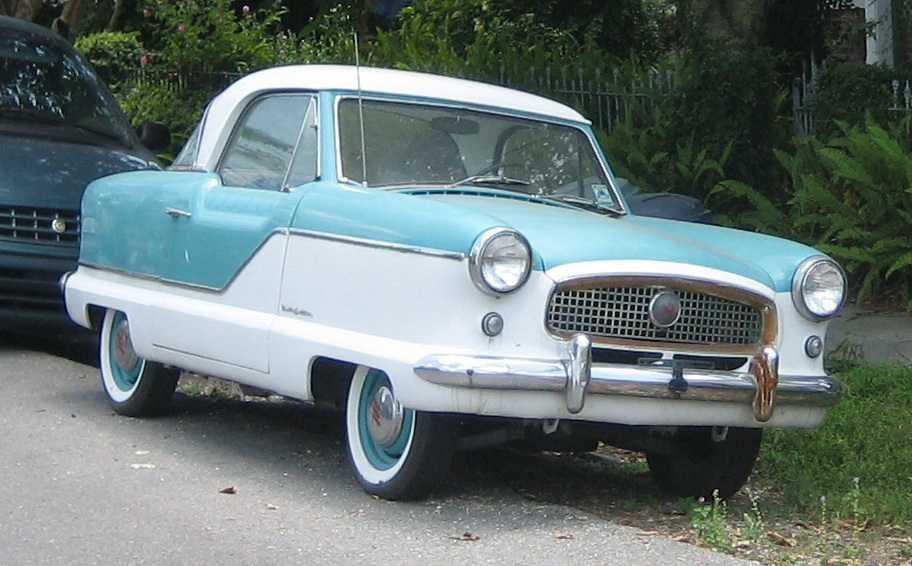
Nash Metropolitan

Seeking to diversify their size offerings further, Mason also orchestrated a contract manufacturing arrangement with Austin of the UK to produce the even smaller car, the Nash Metropolitan, to fill a niche below the Nash Rambler as second or basic transportation car. The diminutive Metropolitan was introduced just before the major merger with Hudson Motors in 1954.

== Introduction of the Nash-Healey ==
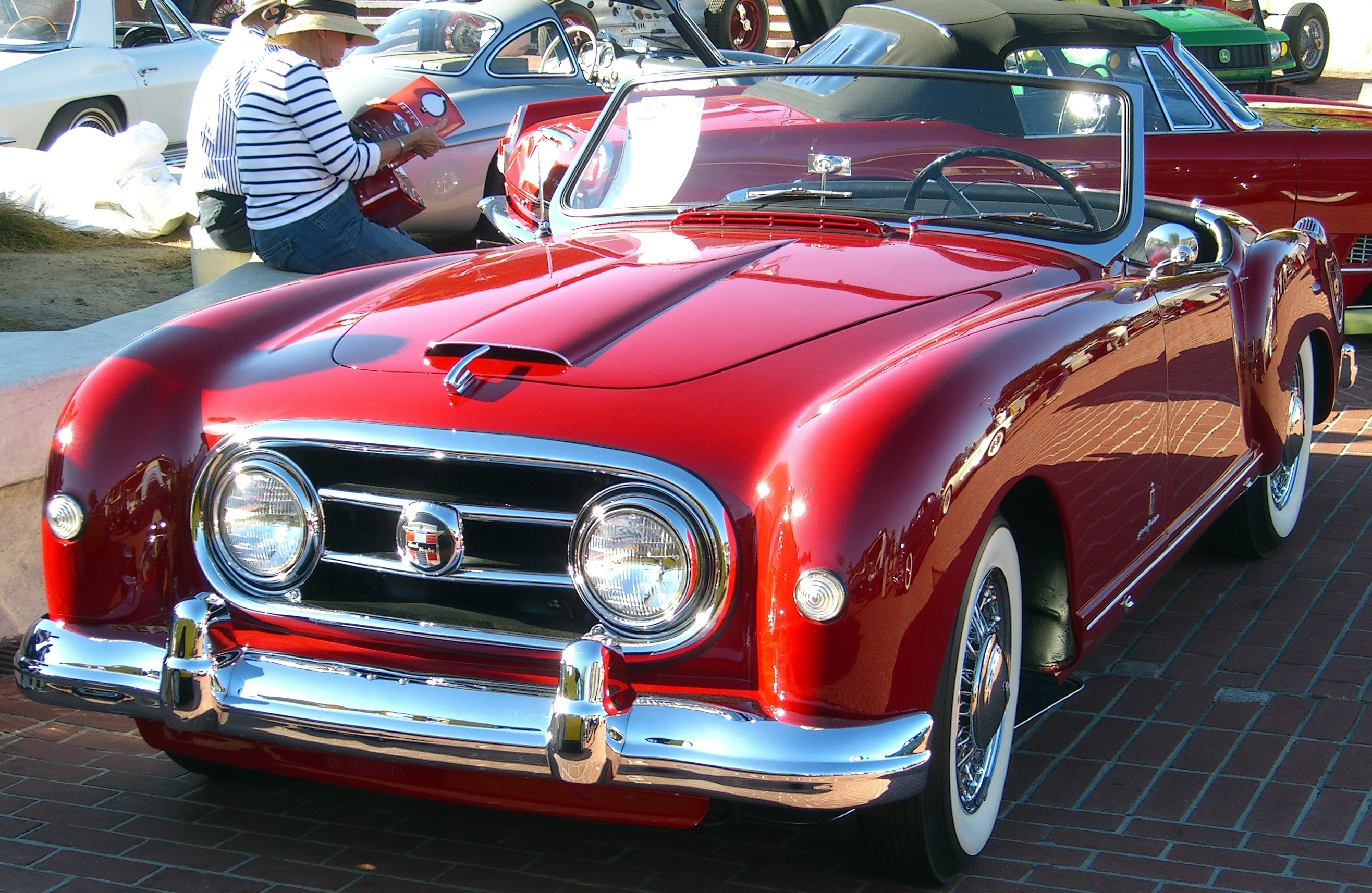
1952 Pininfarina-styled Nash-Healey roadster

The Anglo-American Nash-Healey sports car was introduced in 1951. This was a collaborative effort between George Mason and British sports car manufacturer Donald Healey. Healey designed and built the chassis and suspension and, until 1952, the aluminum body, which another British manufacturer, Panelcraft Sheet Metal, fabricated in Birmingham West Midlands. Nash shipped the powertrain components to England, and Healey assembled the cars, then shipped finished vehicles to the U.S. In 1952, the Italian designer Battista Farina restyled the body, and its construction changed to steel and aluminum.

While a welcome attempt to improve Nash's stodgy image, the Nash-Healey did little to enhance showroom traffic as Nash sales fell steadily from 1951 onward. High costs, low sales, and Nash's focus on the Rambler line led to the termination of Nash-Healey's production in 1954 after 506 automobiles had been produced.

Mason commissioned Farina to design a Rambler-based two-seater coupe called the Palm Beach, which may have been intended as a successor to the Nash-Healey. However, the project only progressed to a concept car.

For European endurance racing, Healey and his staff designed and built three special Nash-Healeys with lightweight aluminum racing bodies. These competition versions entered four consecutive Le Mans races and one Mille Miglia. At Le Mans, they achieved fourth overall in 1950, sixth overall and fourth in class in 1951, third overall and first in class in 1952, and eleventh overall in 1953. In the Mille Miglia, they finished ninth overall in 1950 and seventh overall, as well as placing fourth in class in 1952.

== Anniversary, innovations, and sales ==
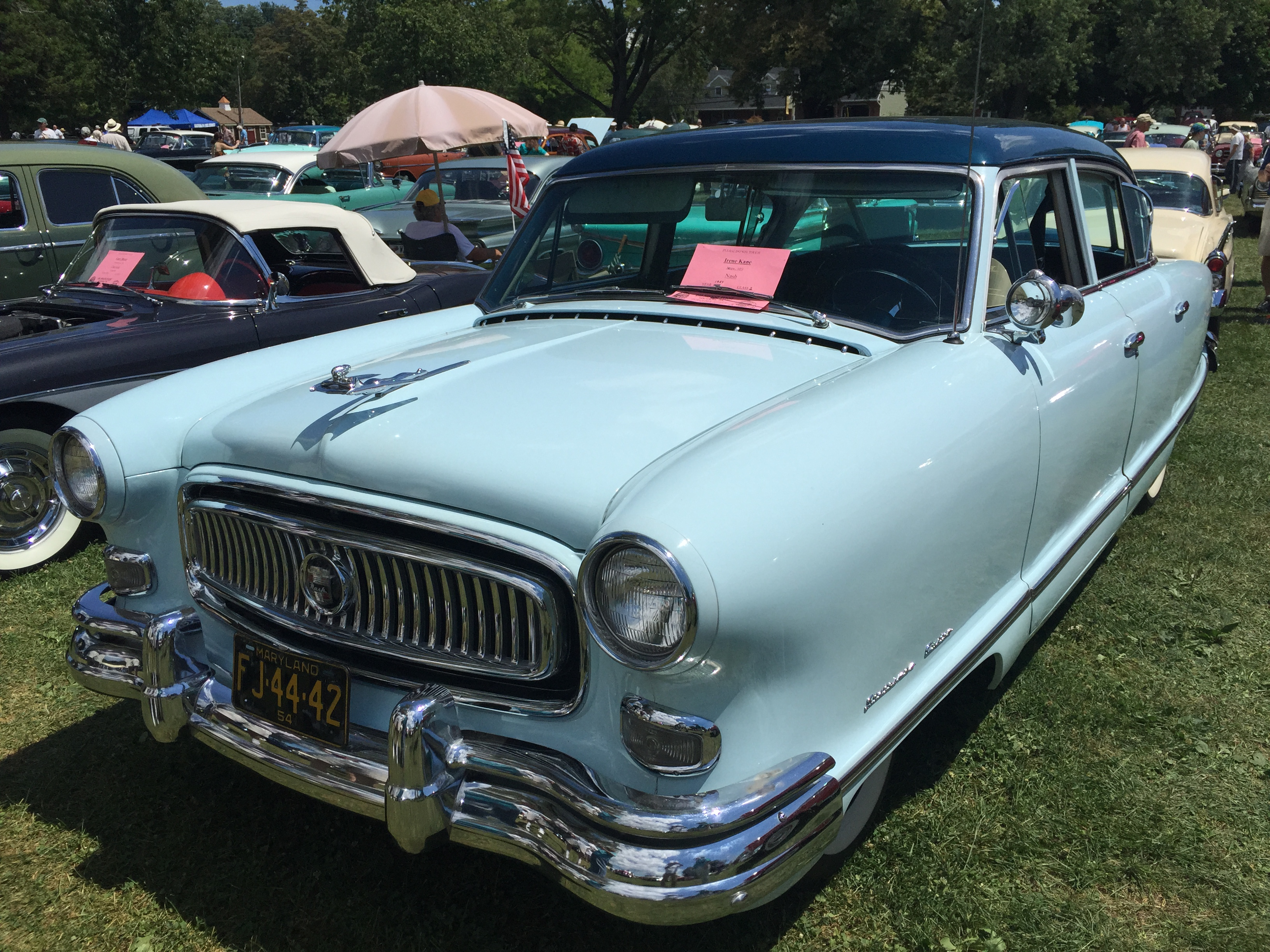
1954 Nash Statesman Custom sedan

The full-size Nash Airflytes were wholly re-designed for the 1952 model year. They were promoted as the "Golden Airflytes" in honor of Nash Motors' 50th anniversary as an automobile builder because the company was counting the years of the Thomas B. Jeffery Company as part of their heritage. Therefore, "Great Cars Since 1902" became one of the company's advertising slogans.

The new Golden Airflytes presented a more modern, squared-off look than did the 1949 through 1951 models, which were often compared to inverted bathtubs. Nash contracted Battista "Pinin" Farina of Italy to design a body for the new Golden Airflyte. Management wanted a better design, and the result was a combination of an in-house design and Pinin Farina's model. Nash began offering automatic transmissions across its domestic-made models, a GM Hydramatic, as well as a Borg-Warner overdrive transmission. Airflytes featured a six-cylinder engine that was now bored out to 252 cubic inches (4.13 L).

Using its Kelvinator refrigeration experience, the automobile industry's first single-unit heating and air conditioning system was introduced by Nash in 1954. This was a compact, affordable system for the mass market with controls on the dash and an electric clutch. Entirely incorporated within the engine bay, the combined heating and cooling system had cold air for passengers enter through dash-mounted vents. Competing systems used a separate heating system and an engine-mounted compressor with an evaporator in the car's trunk to deliver cold air through the rear package shelf and overhead vents. The alternative layout pioneered by Nash "became established practice and continues to form the basis of the modern and more sophisticated automatic climate control systems."

After 1950, it became increasingly difficult for small domestic automakers to compete with the production, distribution, and financial advantages of the Big Three. While the full-sized Airflytes had initially sold well in the postwar "seller's" market, their bulbous styling, rooted in 1940s design trends, quickly became passé, and its underpowered six-cylinder engine proved to be a significant liability against GM's new OHV short-stroke V8s. Like other independent automakers (Hudson, Studebaker, and Packard) Nash charged higher prices for their cars than Ford and GM, which benefited from the economies of scale. The independents also lacked the Big Three's extensive dealer networks or advertising budgets. Lower-profit Rambler sales gradually made up more and more of Nash's total production. Moreover, during 1953 and 1954, Ford and GM waged an all-out price war, further damaging all the independents' sales and financial health. Full-sized Nashes also lacked body styles for buyers to choose; despite introducing a hardtop coupe in 1952, there was no convertible or station wagon, although the Rambler lineup featured all of these versions.

Additionally, while Nash had profited from military contracts during the Korean War, that conflict ended in mid-1953. At the same time, the new Secretary of Defense Charles E. Wilson, ex-GM president, began steering defense contracts to his former employer at the expense of the rest of the automotive industry.

== Formation of American Motors Corporation ==
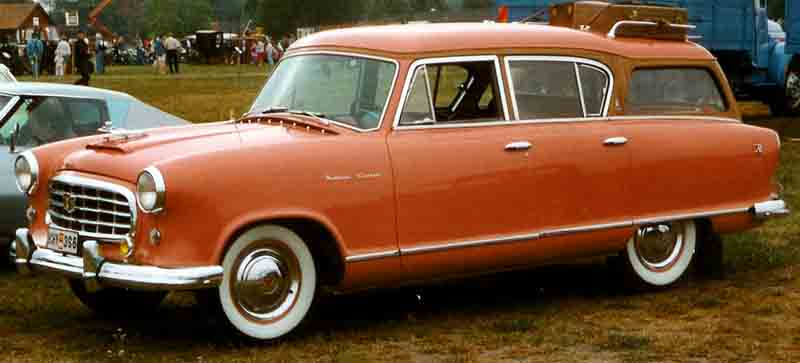
1955 Nash Rambler Cross Country station wagon

In January 1954, Nash announced the acquisition of the Hudson Motor Car Company as a friendly merger, creating American Motors Corporation (AMC). To improve the financial performance of the combined companies, all production, beginning with the 1955 Nash and Hudson models, would happen at Nash's Kenosha plant. Nash would focus most of its marketing resources on its smaller Rambler models, and Hudson would focus its marketing efforts on its full-sized cars.

One of the first things Mason did as CEO of the new company was to initiate talks with James J. Nance, president of Packard, for parts-sharing arrangements between AMC and Packard. At this time, AMC did not have its own V8 engine, and an agreement was made for the new 320 cu in (5.2 L) Packard V8 engine and Packard's Ultramatic automatic transmission to be used in the 1955 Nash Ambassador and Hudson Hornet models.

In July 1954, Packard acquired Studebaker to form Studebaker-Packard Corporation, however, further talks of a merger between AMC and Packard-Studebaker were cut short when Mason died on 8 October 1954. A week after his death, Mason's successor, George W. Romney, announced "there are no mergers under way either directly or indirectly". Nevertheless, Romney continued with Mason's commitment to buy components from Studebaker-Packard Corporation. Although Mason and Nance had previously agreed that Studebaker-Packard would purchase parts from AMC, it did not do so. Moreover, Packard's engines and transmissions were comparatively expensive, so AMC began development of its own V8 engine, and replaced the outsourced unit by mid-1956.

For the 1955 model year, all the large Nash and Hudson automobiles were based on a Nash-derived shared unitized body shell using styling themes by Pinin Farina, Edmund E. Anderson, and Frank Spring. Each had individual powertrains and separate, non-interchangeable body parts. This mimicked the longtime practice Big Three (General Motors, Ford, and Chrysler) that allowed for maximum manufacturing economy. Anderson set up separate design studios for Nash, Hudson, and Rambler.

George Romney ordered the removal of the front fender skirts on Nashes and Ramblers for the 1955 models. Customers disliked this feature, yet it was reportedly demanded by George Mason, who liked their appearance.

Even with the merger forming AMC, they were held to a total of about four percent of the market and thus were under pressure to lower expenses and tooling costs for new models, perhaps by innovation.

The Nash Metropolitan, marketed under either the Nash or Hudson brands, became a make unto its own in 1957, as did the Rambler. By this point, Rambler sales comprised most of AMC's volume, so George Romney decided to phase out the Nash and Hudson nameplates and focus solely on Rambler. This move would pay off the following year when an economic recession struck the United States and created a strong demand for economical compact cars. Nash and Hudson production ended with the last Hornet made on 25 June, 1957. From 1958 until 1962, Rambler and the Metropolitan were the only brands of cars sold by AMC. By 1965, the Rambler name would begin to be phased out, and AMC would take over as the brand name until the 1988 model year.

In 1970, American Motors acquired Kaiser Jeep (the descendant of Willys-Overland Motors) and its Toledo, Ohio, based manufacturing facilities. In 1979, AMC established a technology partnership with Renault. In 1987, Chrysler Corporation made a public offering to acquire all shares of AMC on the NYSE. The shareholders approved the offer, and AMC became a division of Chrysler Corporation.

== International markets ==
Since the early days, Nash vehicles were exported as complete cars or in knock-down kit form for local assembly to many countries around the world including right-hand-drive markets such as the United Kingdom, Australia, New Zealand, and South Africa. International production for both the Nash and Hudson Marques was consolidated after the merger of Nash and Hudson to form American Motors Corporation (AMC) in 1954, after which international-bound operations were conducted at the former Nash factory in Kenosha and the Brampton plant in Canada until 1957, when both the Nash and Hudson Marques were retired.

=== Australia ===
Several distributors for each Australian state built and sold Nash vehicles in the 1920s. As was the practice for all car brands during the early 20th Century, the chassis and engines were imported, and Australian coach builders locally built the bodies. Early distributors were Wilsford Limited for New South Wales, Richards Brothers for Victoria and the Riverina, Peels Limited for Queensland, Eric Madren Motors (later Nash Cars (W.A) Limited) for Western Australia, and Northern Motors for Tasmania. The recovery period following the end of World War II saw a lull in car manufacturing, petrol rationing, and currency shortages. Some cars were imported in the late 1940s and 1950s despite these factors. In 1950, a few Nash trucks were assembled by Davies Pty Ltd in Launceston, Tasmania.

After the Nash-Hudson merger in 1954, AMC's new Rambler vehicles were imported into Australia and distributed by Ira L. & A.C Berk Pty Ltd which had previously held the Hudson franchise since 1939. Hudson was the more recognized brand in Australia, so they were initially sold as Hudson. The Nash Metropolitan was not sold in Australia. The first Rambler-badged vehicles were imported in 1957. This first shipment consisted of 24 cars, 10 of which were Rambler station wagons. Small numbers of Rambler Sixes were imported into Australia up until 1960. AMC made a new deal with Port Melbourne vehicle assembler Australian Motor Industries (AMI) in 1960 to build AMC vehicles from knock-down kits, production of which ran from 1961 until 1976. AMI eventually became Toyota Australia.

=== New Zealand ===
From 1935, Nash motor vehicles were assembled in New Zealand by Christchurch company Motor Assemblies Limited. The plant also made Studebaker and Standard vehicles and was acquired by Standard Motors in 1954. Production was then moved to Auckland company VW Motors at their Volkswagen plant in Otahuhu, Auckland until 1962. New Zealand saw the Nash Ramblers and the British-built, right-hand-drive Nash Metropolitan. In 1963, AMC struck a deal with Thames company Campbell Motors to build a new vehicle assembly plant for AMC vehicles, which began production in 1964. Renamed Campbell Motor Industries (CMI), the plant built Rambler vehicles from knock-down kits until 1971. CMI eventually became Toyota New Zealand.

=== South Africa ===
Following World War II, Nash motor vehicles were assembled in South Africa by a newly built assembly operation in East London Car Distributors and Assemblers (CDA). The plant also built Packard, Renault, and Standard motor vehicles. CDA was eventually taken over, first by Chrysler, and finally by Peugeot.

=== United Kingdom ===
Nash vehicles were imported into the United Kingdom by London company Nash Concessionaires. After 1961, Rambler imports switched to the former U.K Hudson operation in Chiswick which was accordingly renamed Rambler Motors (A.M.C.) Limited. AMC's deal with Austin for the production of the Nash Metropolitan was independent of the Chiswick Rambler operation.

== Gallery ==
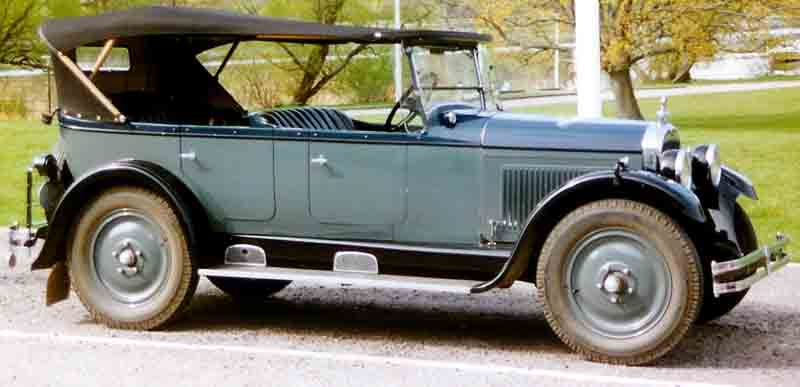
Nash Six Touring 1927

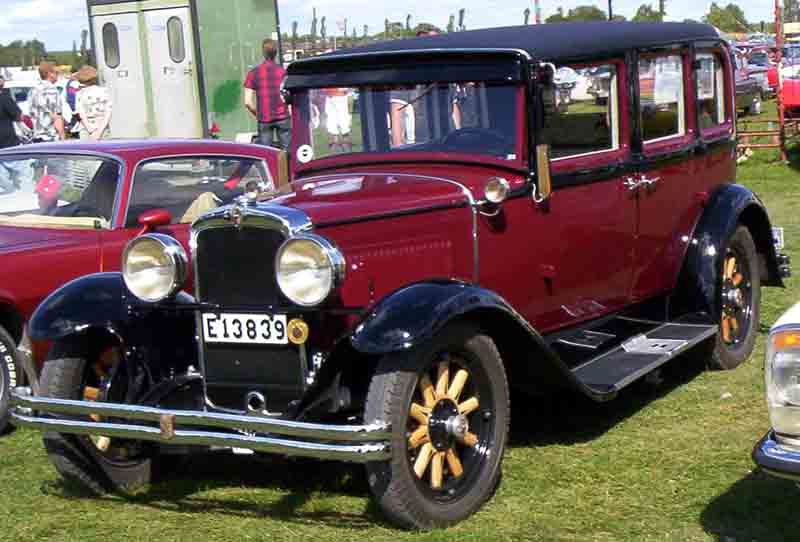
Nash Standard Six Series 420 4-Door Sedan 1929

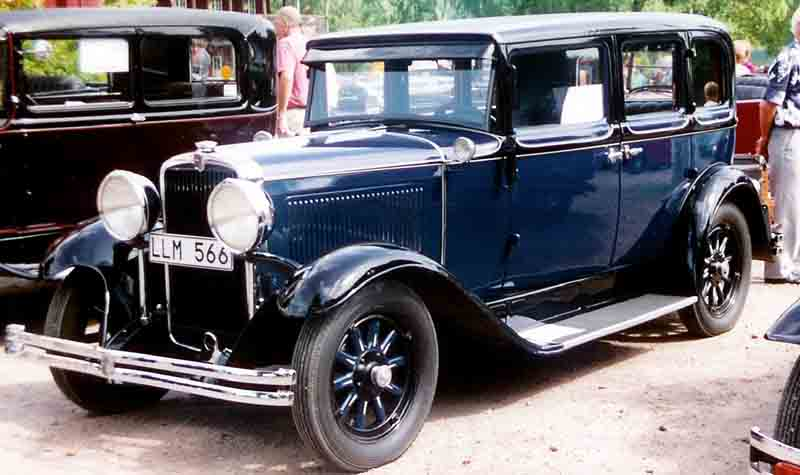
Nash Single Six Series 450 4-Door Sedan 1930

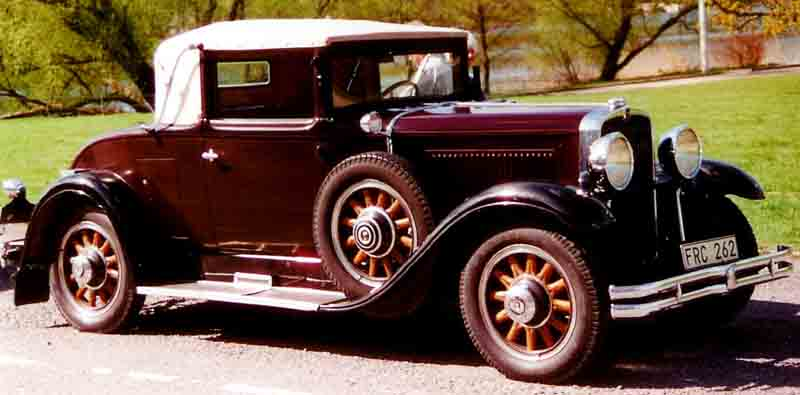
Nash Twin-Ignition Six Series 481 Convertible Coupé 1930

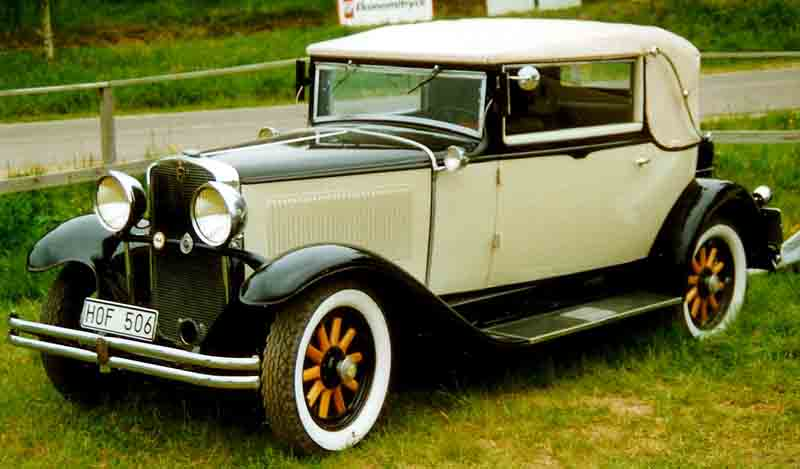
Nash Series 871 Convertible Sedan 1931

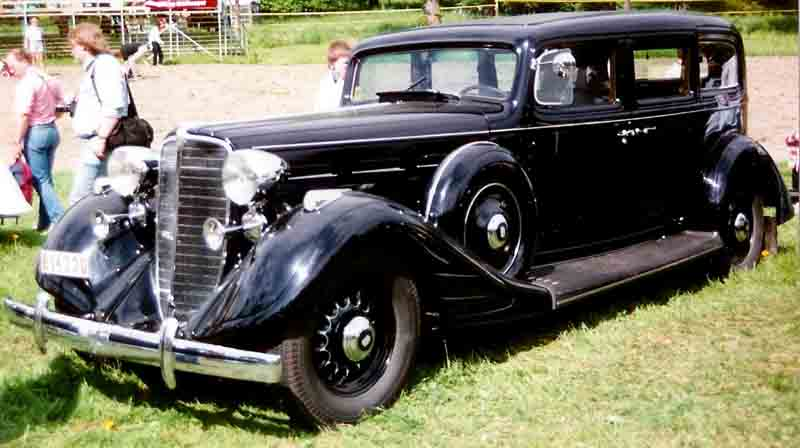
Nash Ambassador Eight 4-Door Sedan 1934

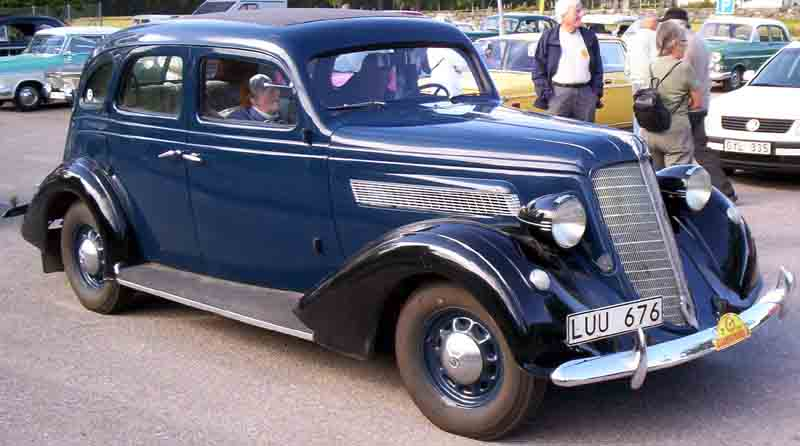
Nash Advanced Six Series 3520 4-Door Sedan 1935

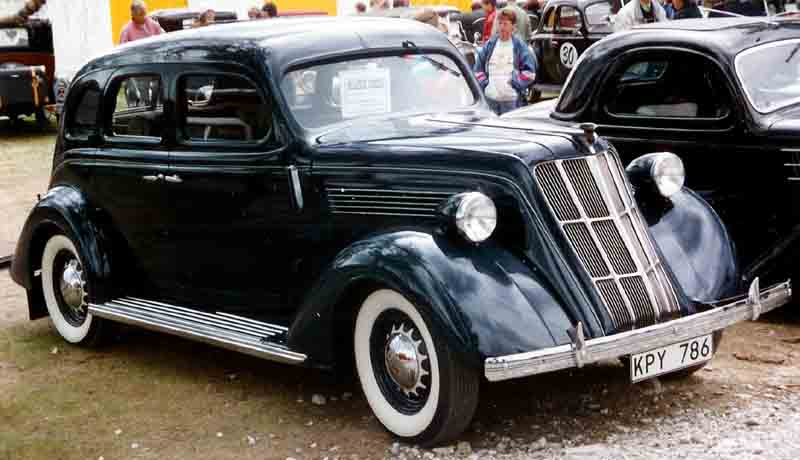
Nash 3540 400 4-Door Sedan 1935

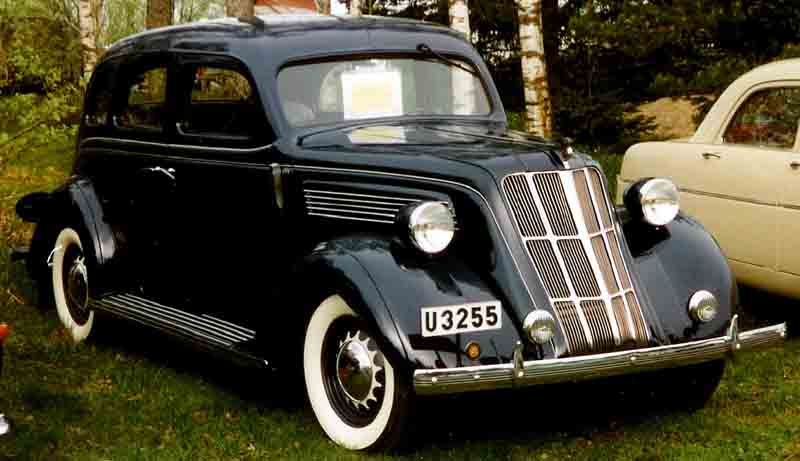
Nash 3540 400 4-Door Sedan 1935

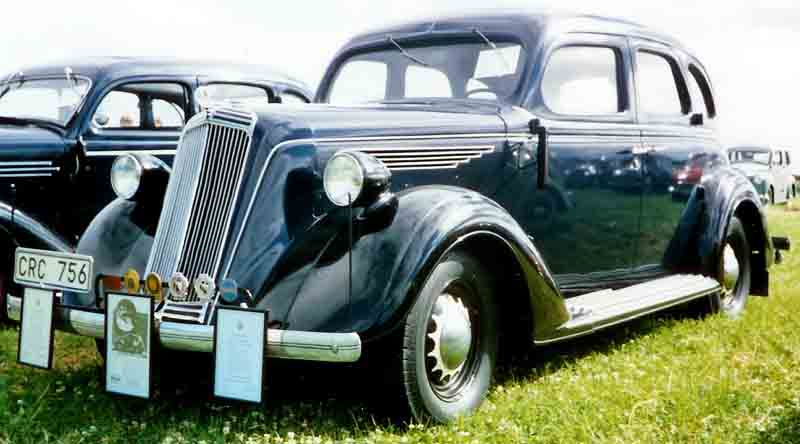
Nash Lafayette Series 3610 4-Door Sedan 1936

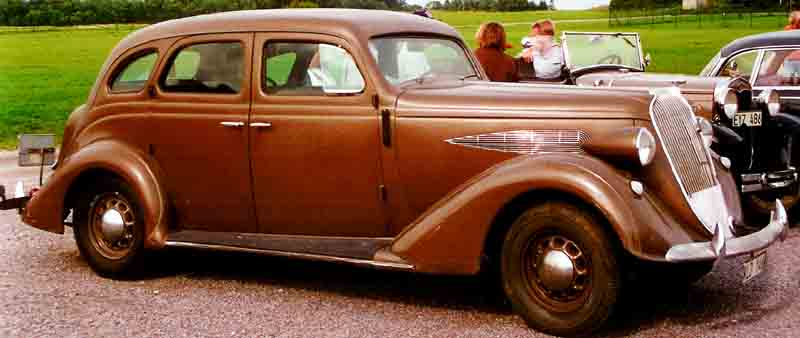
Nash Ambassador Six 3620 4-Door Sedan 1936

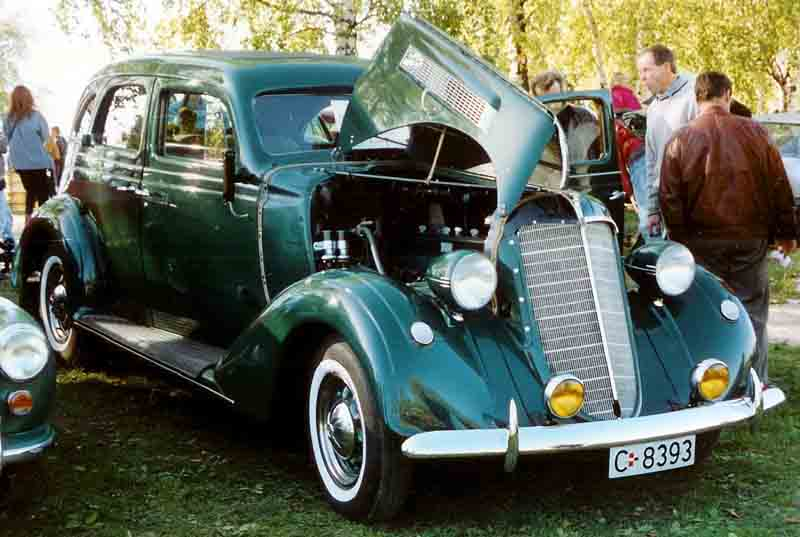
Nash 4-Door Sedan

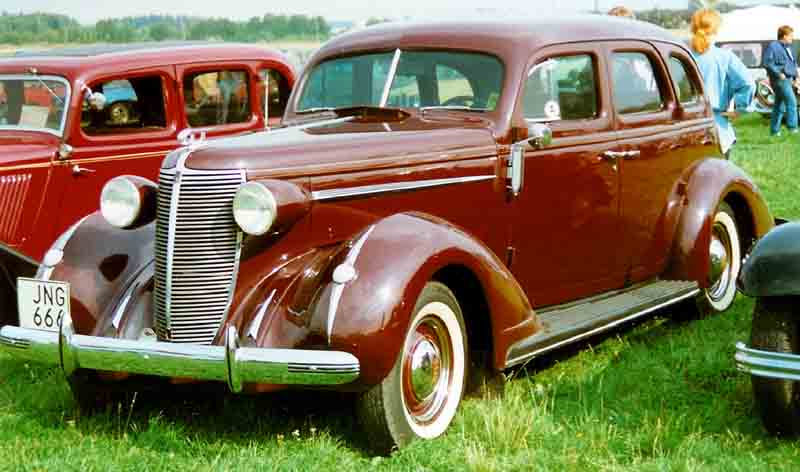
Nash Ambassador Six Series 3728 4-Door Sedan 1937

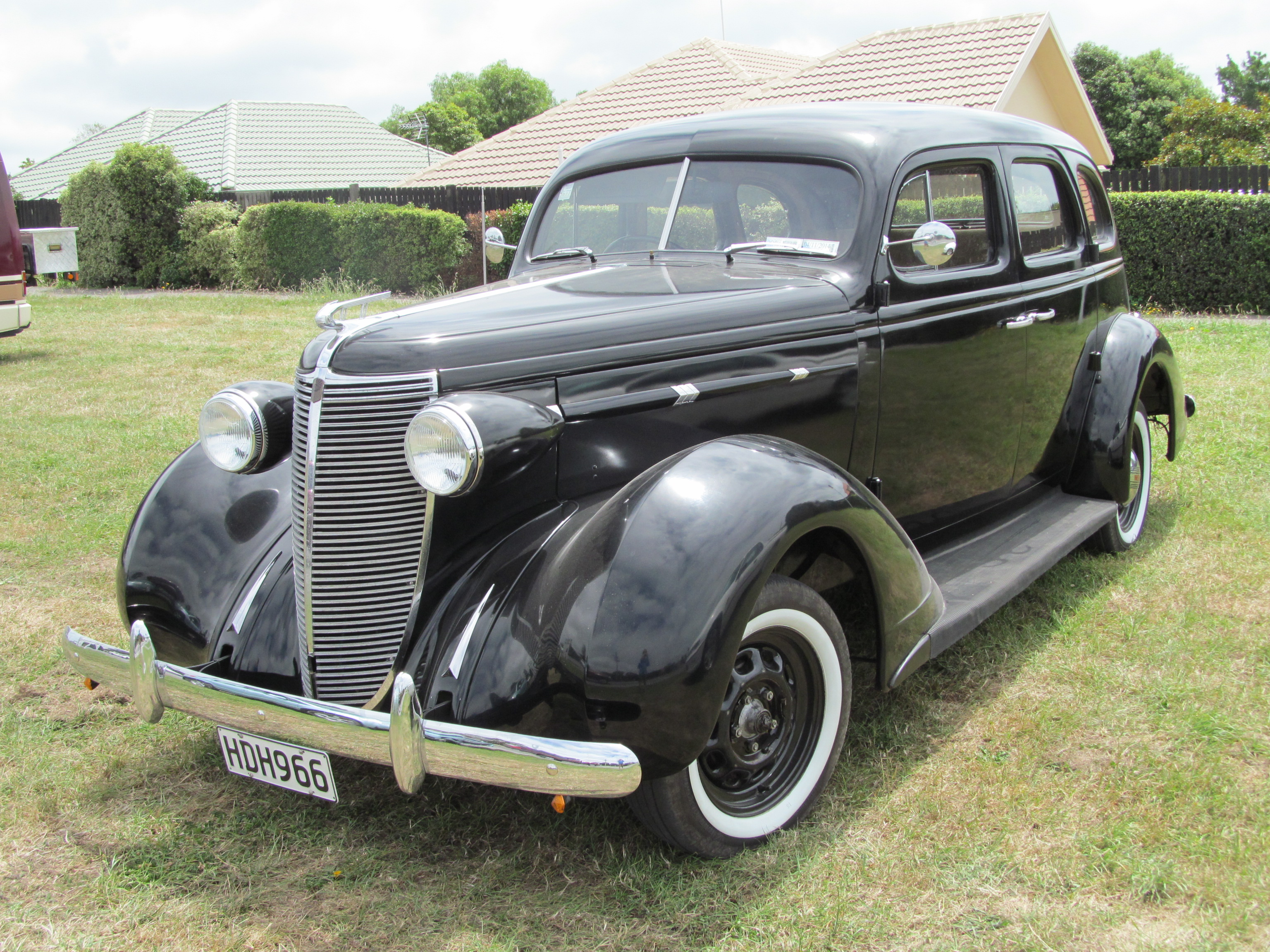
1937 Nash Lafayette in New Zealand

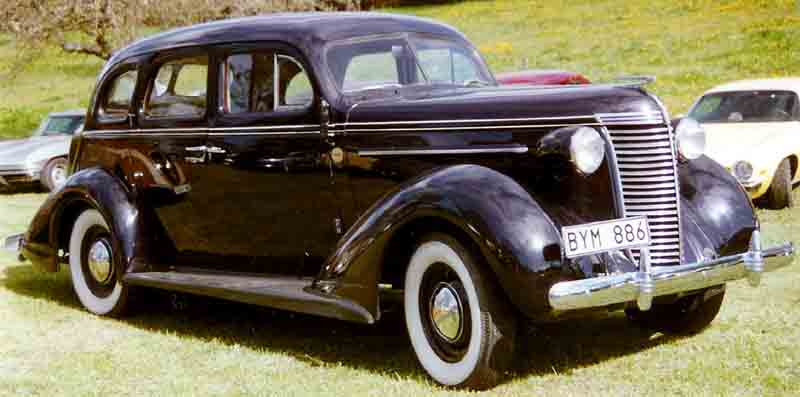
Nash Lafayette Series 3818 4-Door Sedan 1938

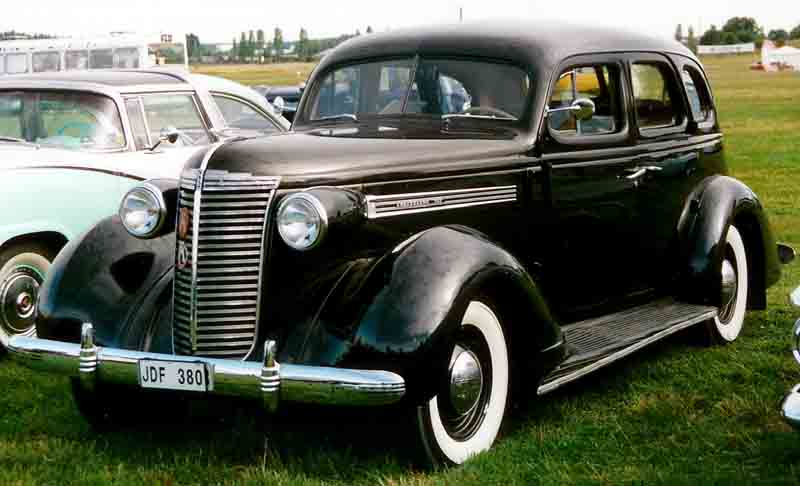
Nash Ambassador Six Series 3828 4-Door Sedan 1938

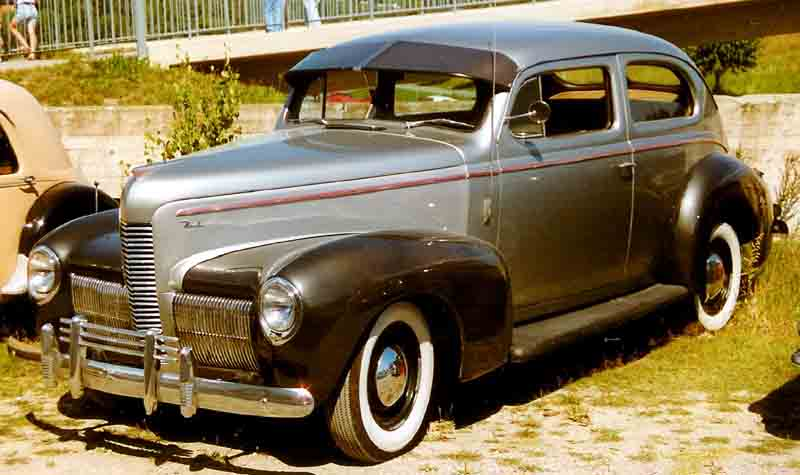
Nash 2-Door Sedan 1940

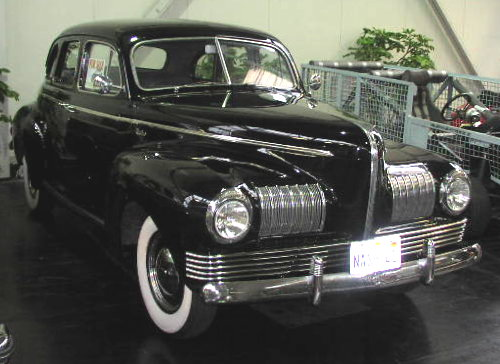
Nash Ambassador Six four-door sedan 1941

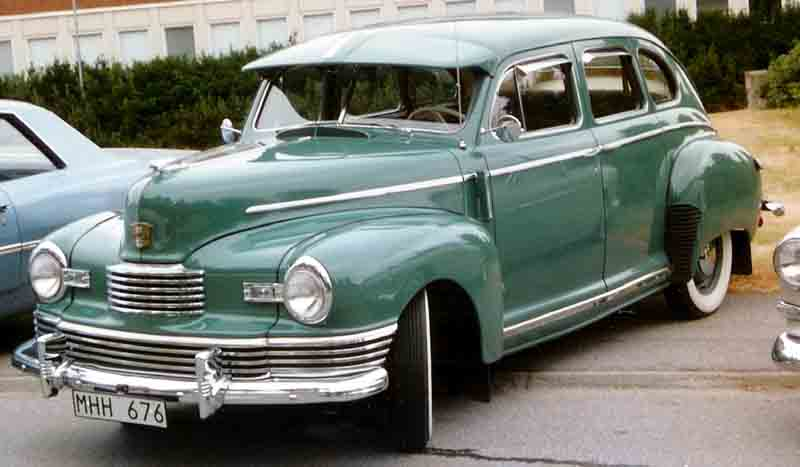
Nash 4-Door Sedan 1946

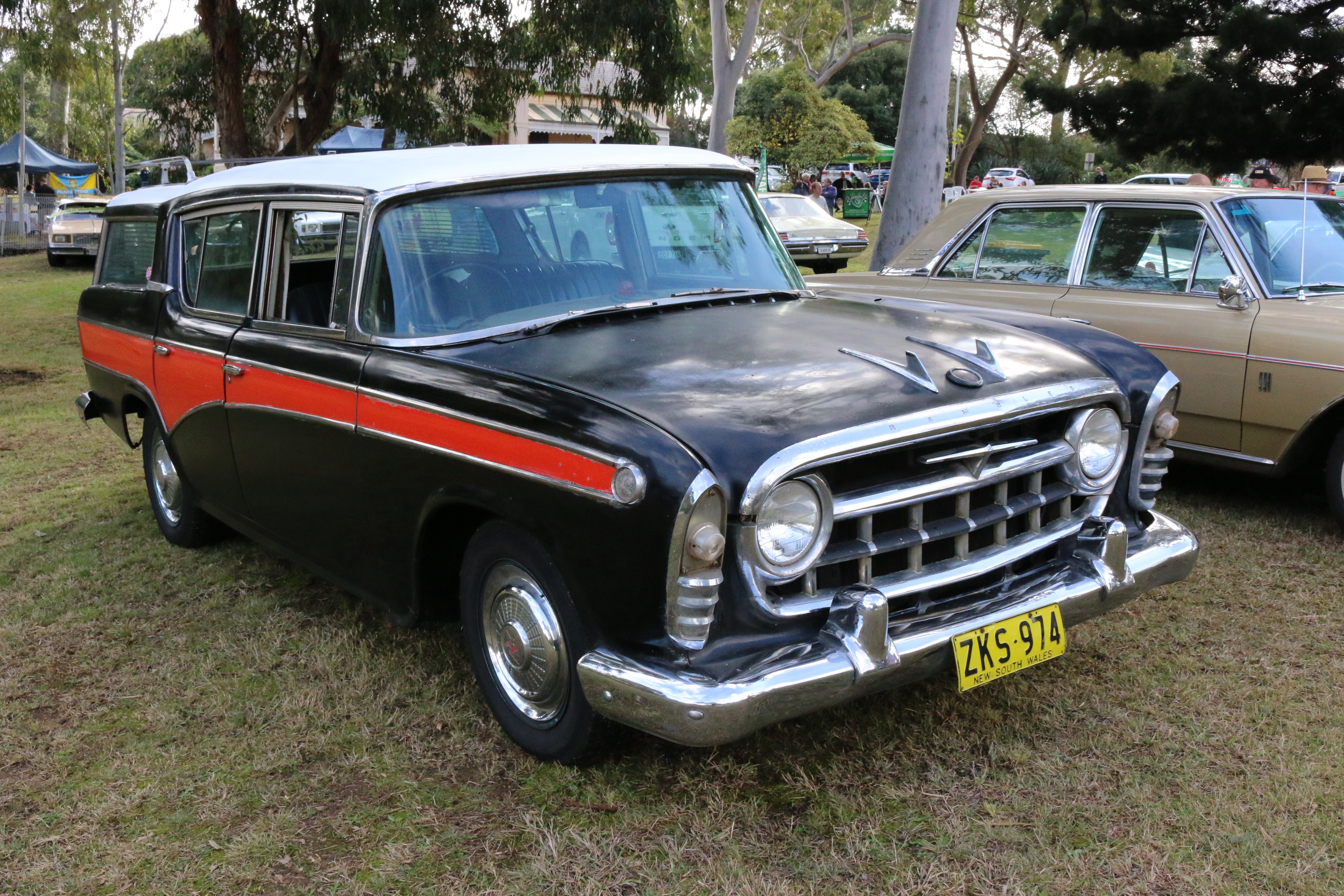
Australian right-hand drive 1957 Nash Rambler wagon

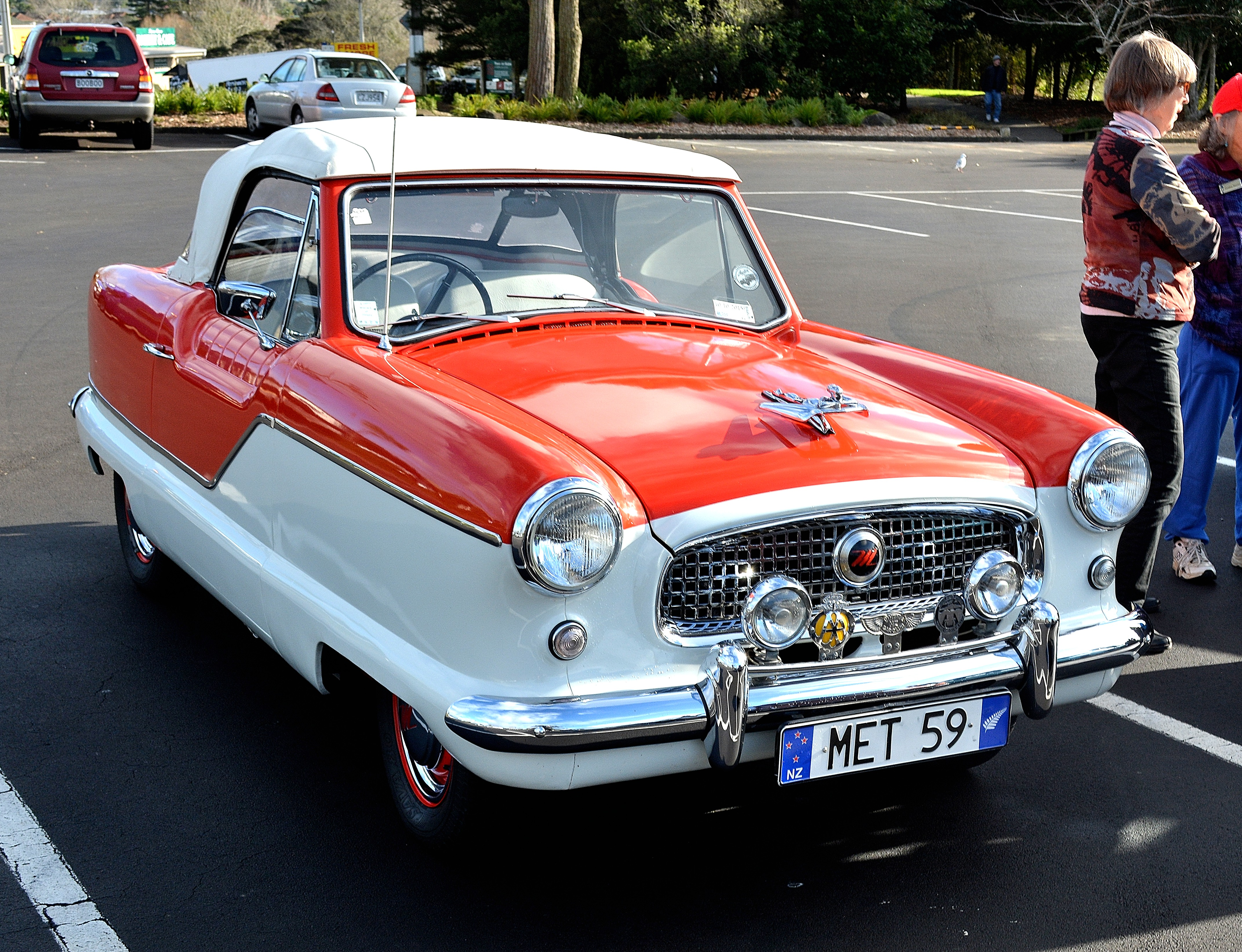
New Zealand right-hand drive 1959 Nash Metropolitan

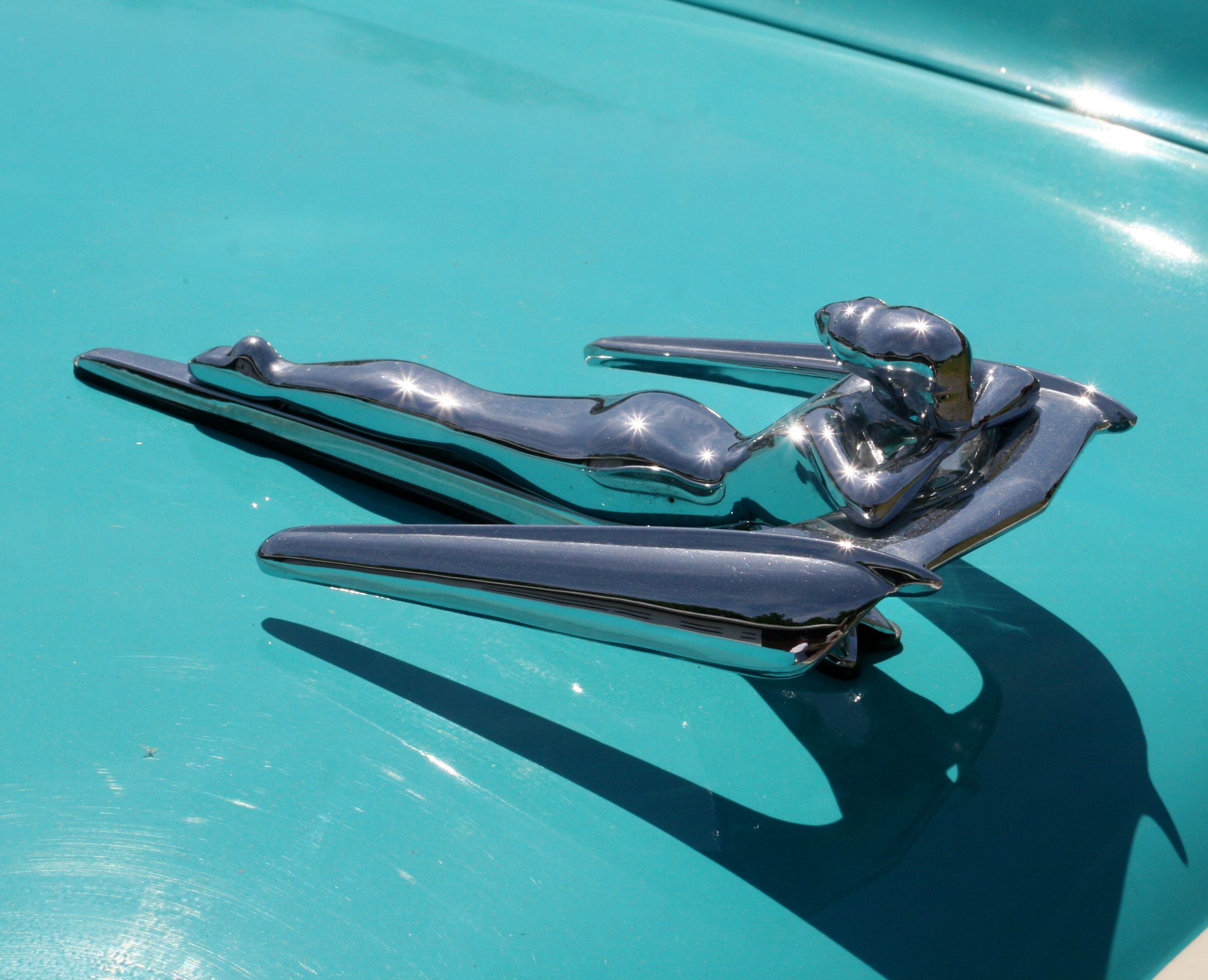
Detail from a Nash Metropolitan

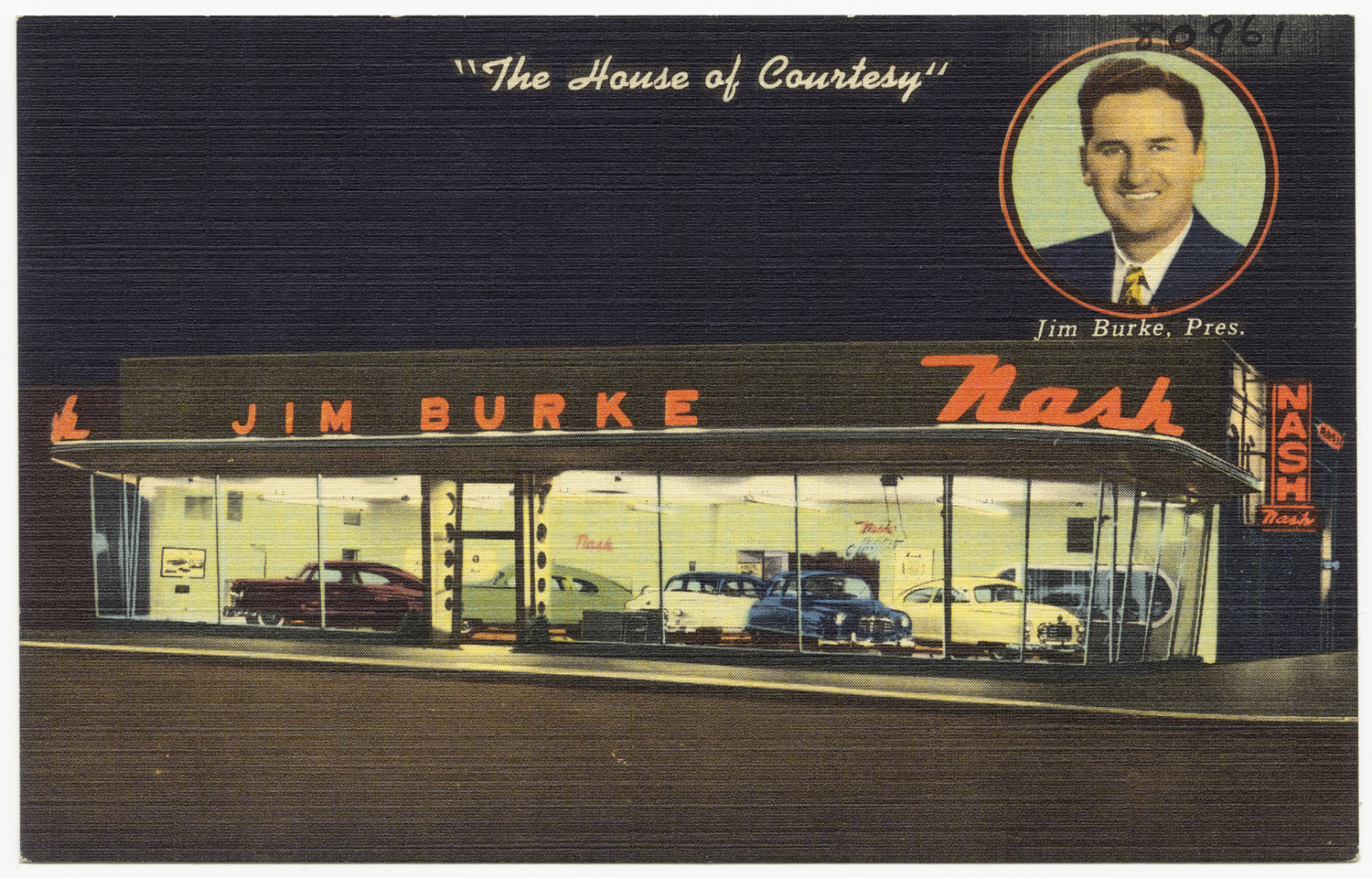
Nash dealership in Alabama, ca. 1930-1945

== Nash automobile brands ==
- LaFayette
- Ajax
- Rambler
- Nash-Healey
- Jeffery

== Nash automobiles ==
- Nash 600
- Nash Statesman
- Ambassador
- Metropolitan
- Nash-Healey, in cooperation with Donald Healey, was assembled in the UK and Italy.
- Nash Rambler
- Rambler

== Motorsport ==
Like most American manufacturers of the fifties, Nash participated in the Grand National Stock Car series.

== See also ==
- Pratt & Whitney R-2800 Double Wasp, built by Nash during WWII
