= Ajax (Nash Motors) =

Defunct American motor vehicle manufacturer

Ajax Six
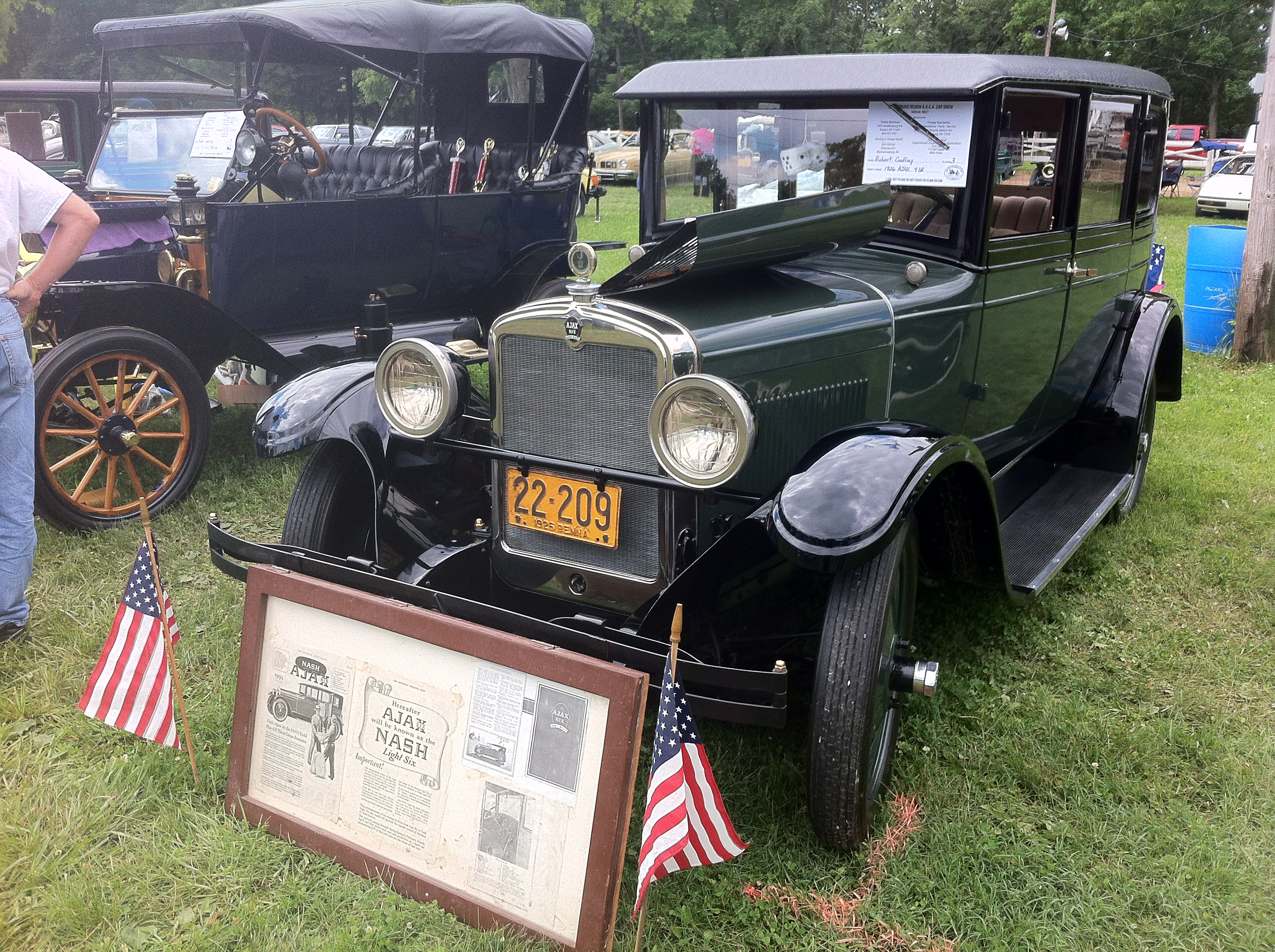
- 1926 Ajax sedan

Overview
- Manufacturer: Nash Motors Company
- Also called: Nash Light Six
- Production: 27,300 units; 38,622 units
- Assembly: Racine, Wisconsin, U.S.

Body and chassis
- Body style: 2-door sedan; 4-door sedan; 4-door touring
- Layout: FR layout

Powertrain
- Engine: 170 cu in (2.8 L) I6
- Transmission: 3-speed manual

Dimensions
- Wheelbase: 109 in (2,769 mm)

Chronology
- Successor: Nash Light Six

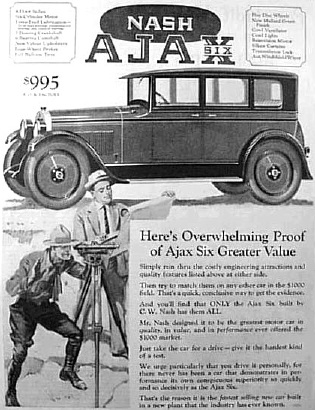
1925 Ajax advertisement

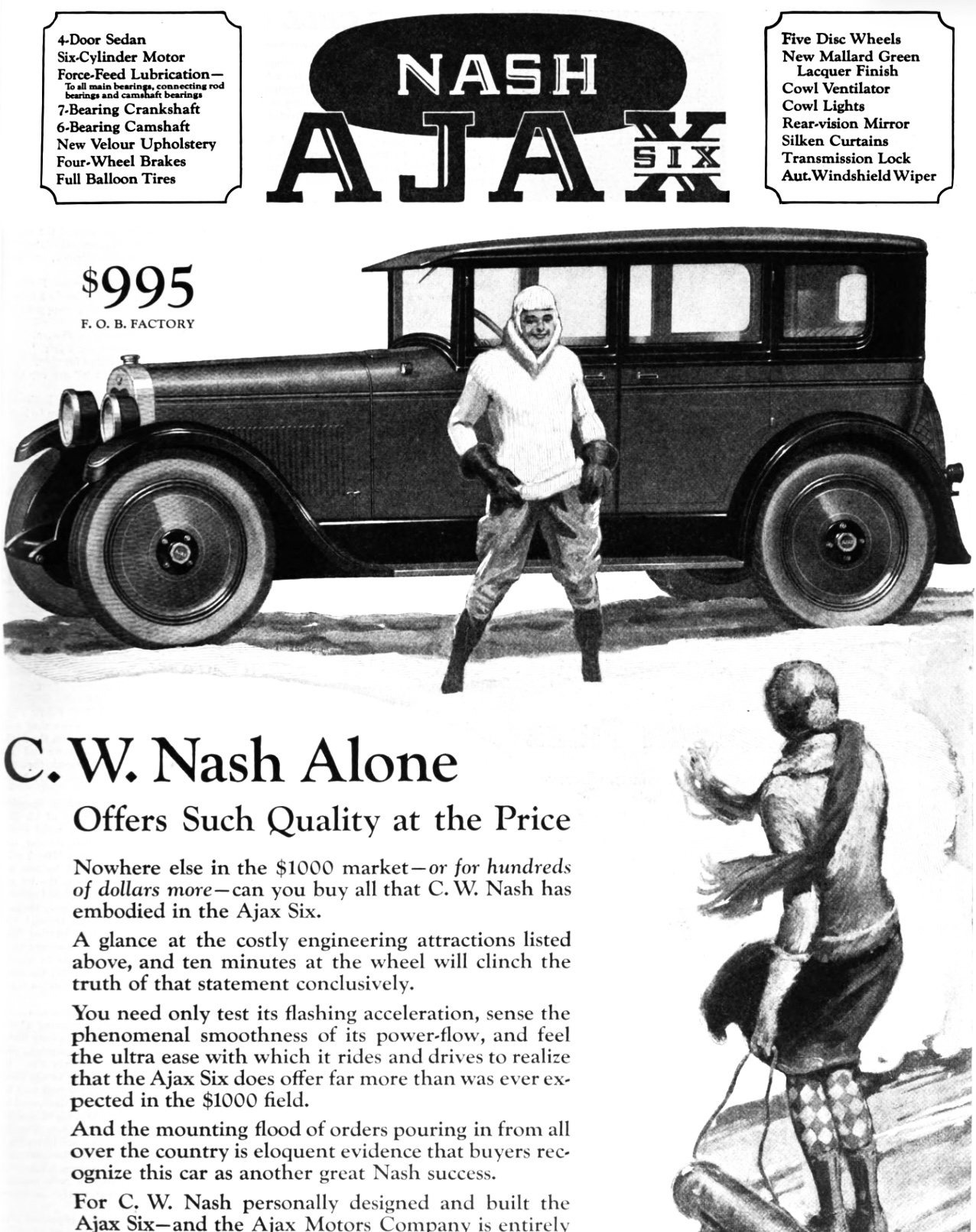
1926 Ajax advertisement

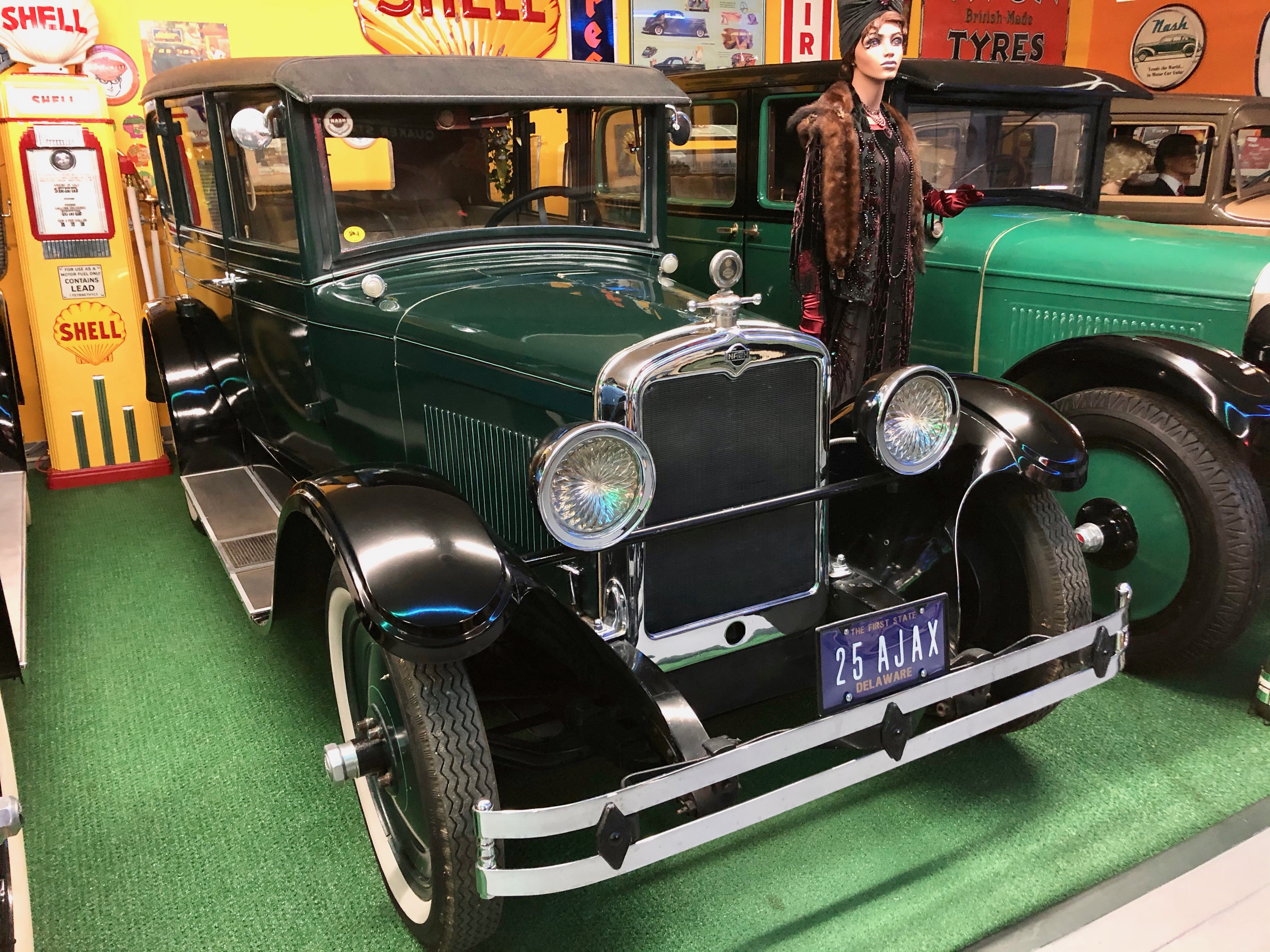
1925 Ajax

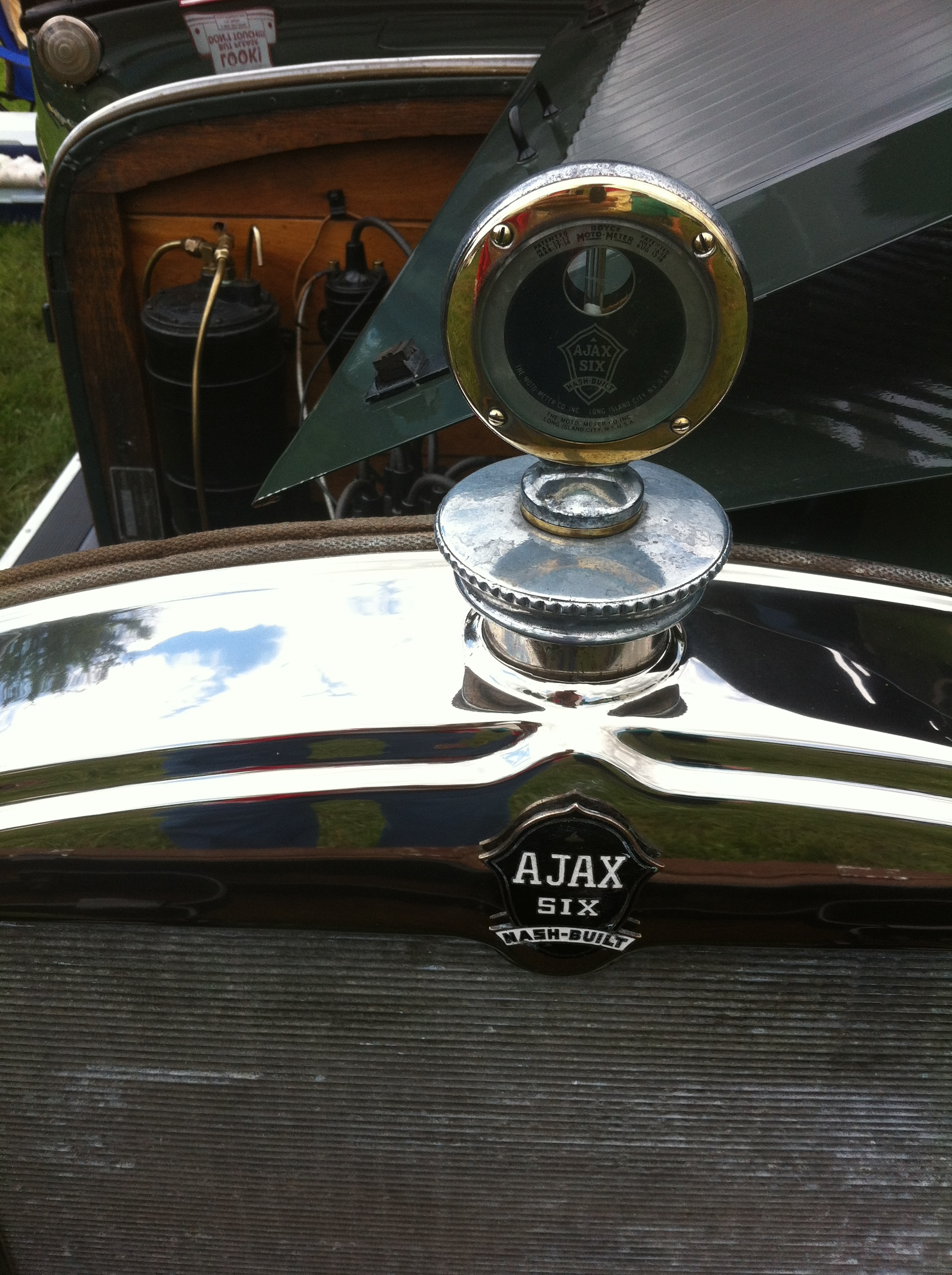
"Ajax Six Nash-Built" radiator ornament

The Ajax was an American automobile brand manufactured by the Nash Motors Company of Kenosha, Wisconsin, in 1925 and 1926. The Ajax was produced in the newly acquired Mitchell Motors Company plant in Racine, Wisconsin. In 1926, all Ajax models were converted into Nash Light Sixes.

== Origin ==
Demand for Nash automobiles was so high that by November 1924, the company's existing plants were operating around the clock six days a week, and Charles W. Nash announced a US$1 million expansion at the automaker's original Kenosha facility.

Mitchell Motors Company was the manufacturer of Mitchell brand automobiles from 1903 through 1923. In April 1923 the company was forced into bankruptcy. At the 31 January 1924 auction of the Mitchell land and buildings with 500,000-square-foot (46,000 m^{2}) of floor space, Charles Nash offered the winning bid of $405,000.

The Ajax was built using machinery moved from Nash's other acquisition, the LaFayette Motors Company of Milwaukee, and installed in the Racine plant. Thus, new Ajax was based on an earlier design, premium version of the Lafayette from the early 1920s. The Ajax was available in three body styles: a 4-door sedan, a 4-door touring, and a 2-door sedan. The advertised retail price was $865 for the five-passenger touring car and $995 for the five-passenger four-door sedan.

The Ajax came standard with a 170 cu in (2.8 L) L-head Nash straight-six engine with a seven main bearing crankshaft, force-feed lubrication system, three-speed transmission, four-wheel brakes (at that time unusual for a car of its price), steel disc wheels, as well as mohair velvet upholstery and an electric clock. The Ajax Six produced "genuine 60 mph" (97 km/h) driving.

== Badge engineering ==
The manufacture of the Ajax was identical, but customers were not believing that "the value-oriented Ajax brand" was a Nash car. Despite receiving good reviews from the automotive press and the general public, the Ajax brand was discontinued in 1926 after 22,122 Model 21 and Model 51 were sold. Charles Nash ordered that the production continue instead as the Nash Light Six.

The Nash was a known and respected automobile brand that was also the name of the company's founder. Production was stopped for two days while Nash hubcaps, emblems, and radiator shells were trucked to Racine where all unshipped Ajax brand cars were converted into Nash badged automobiles. Likewise, changeover kits were sent to dealers to retrofit all unsold cars by removing the Ajax badges such as those found on the hubcaps. However, some cars included "Ajax Six, Nash-built" on the Moto-Meter label and an Ajax Motors logo on the serial number tag.

One of the first cases of "badge engineering" began in 1917 with Texan automobiles assembled in Fort Worth, Texas, that made use of Elcar bodies made in Elkhart, Indiana. However, the transformation of the Ajax was "probably the industry's first example of one car becoming another.". Nash even made the kits available at no charge to consumers who bought Ajax cars, but did not want to own an orphaned make automobile, to protect the investment they had made in a Nash Motors product. Because of this, few unmodified original Ajax cars have survived.

Sales of the rechristened Nash Light Six improved with the more known moniker. The 1926 four-door sedan was now advertised for $1,525. The combined Ajax and Nash Light accounted for more than 24% of the automaker's total production in 1926.
