= LaFayette Motors =

Defunct American motor vehicle manufacturer

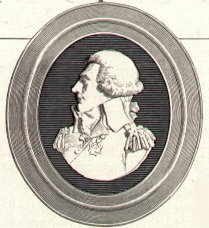
LaFayette logo

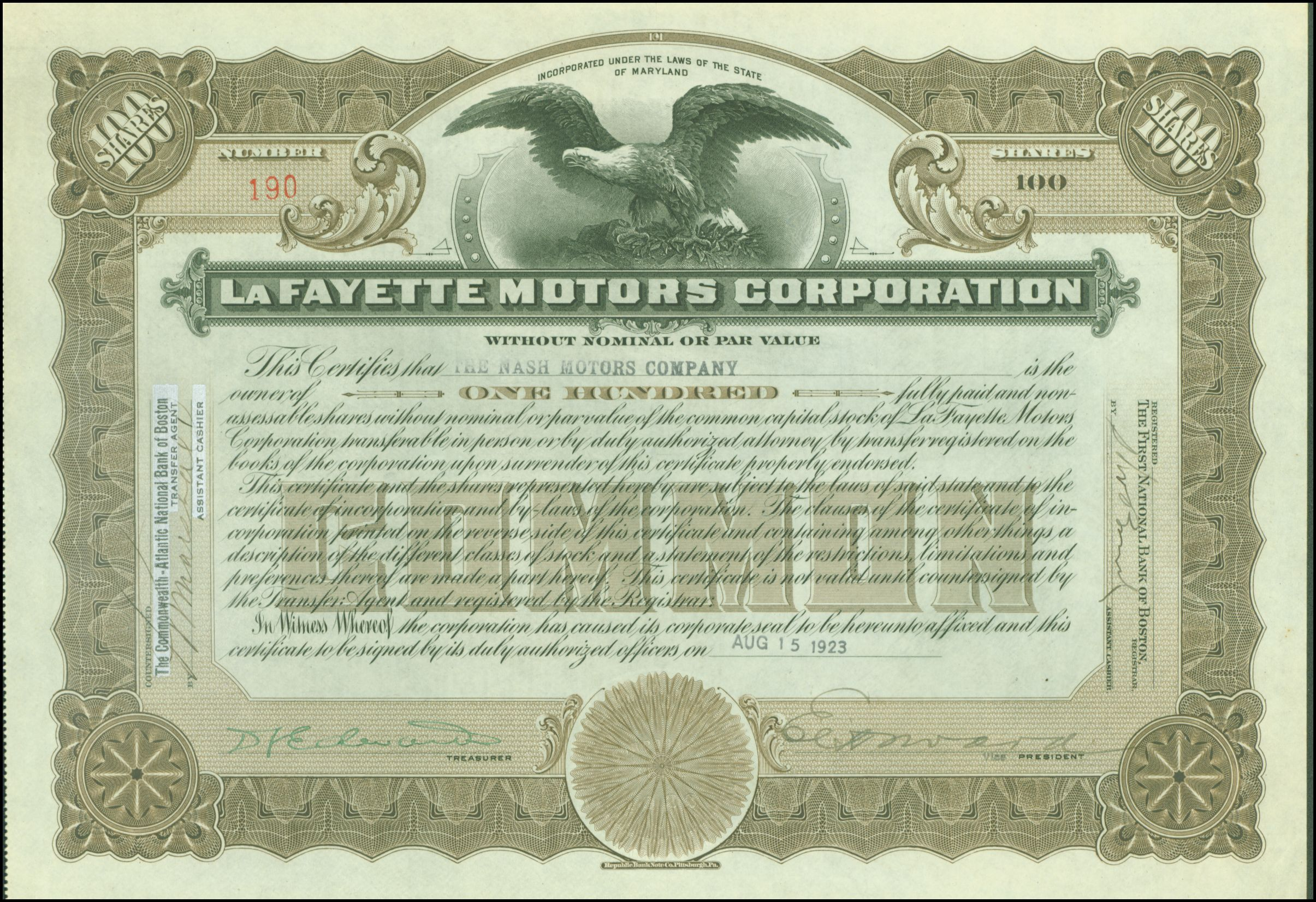
Share of the LaFayette Motors Corp., issued 15 August 1923

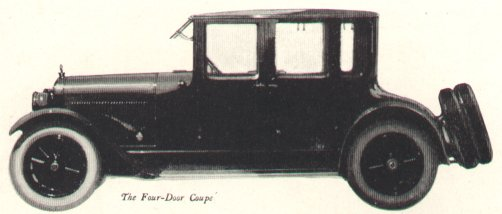
1921 LaFayette Four-Door Coupe

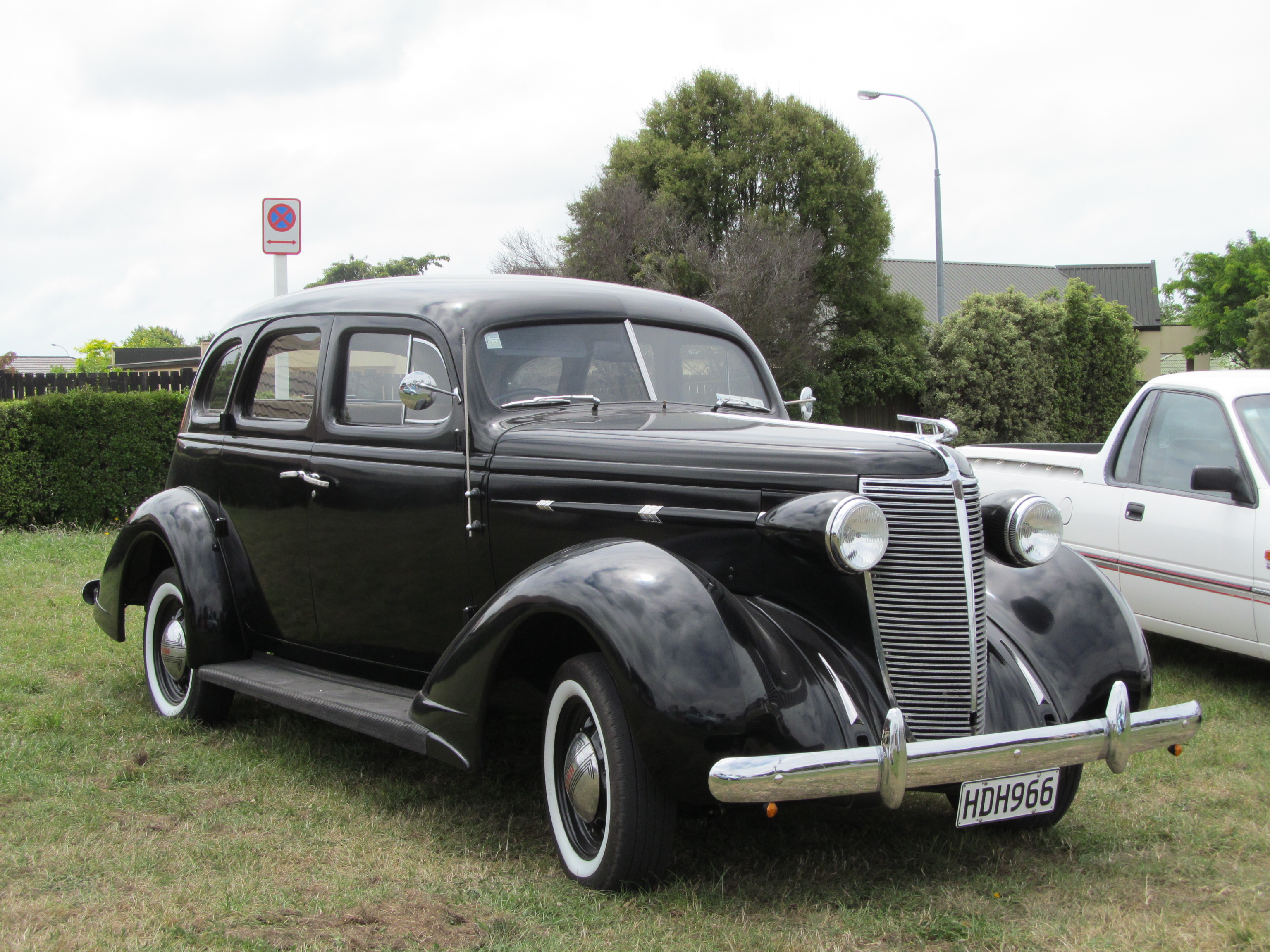
1937 Nash LaFayette 400

The LaFayette Motors Corporation was a United States–based automobile manufacturer. Founded in 1919, LaFayette Motors was named in honor of the Marquis de la Fayette, and LaFayette autos had a cameo of the Marquis as their logo.

== History ==
LaFayette was originally headquartered in Mars Hill, Indianapolis, Indiana, and made luxury motor cars, beginning in 1920. LaFayette innovations include the first electric clock in an auto. However, the V8-powered LaFayette cars had low sales given their price of $5,000 when introduced in 1920, equal to $80,357 today.

=== Charles Nash becomes president ===
In 1921, Charles W. Nash became president of LaFayette. Nash was already president of Nash Motors, but for a time the two brands remained separate companies, although Nash Motors was the principal LaFayette Motors stock holder. The LaFayette was considered a halo marque.

1923 LaFayette Model 123 in the Nethercutt Collection.

In early 1920s, there was speculation about a merger of Pierce-Arrow with LaFayette, Rolls-Royce, or General Motors. A proposed merger with LaFayette did not occur in 1924. Ultimately, Studebaker took control of Pierce-Arrow in 1928.

In 1922, LaFayette's facilities were moved to Milwaukee, Wisconsin.

=== Acquired by Nash Motors ===
In 1924, Nash Motors became full owner of LaFayette Motors, and the name was retired soon after. Its factories were quickly put to a new, more profitable use: the manufacture of Ajax motor cars.

=== Nash LaFayette ===
In 1934, Nash re-introduced the LaFayette name, this time for a line of smaller, less expensive models. Marketed at as “LaFayette Built By Nash", the cars included some Nash high-end features. They were well-engineered with "conservatively attractive" styling by Alexis de Sakhnoffsky. However, sales of the popular-priced cars did not meet expectations due to the general economic situation during the Great Depression.

In 1935, Nash introduced a series known as the "Nash 400" to fill the perceived price gap between the LaFayette and the Nash.

It was determined that this perceived gap was not so important, and that Nash Motors was marketing too many models. The LaFayette and the Nash 400 were combined into a single model called the Nash LaFayette 400 for the 1937 model year. The LaFayette ceased to be regarded as a separate make of car. The base price of $595 (equal to $13,326 today) was competitive to Ford and Plymouth models. The Nash LaFayette 400 featured a 5-inch (127 mm) longer wheelbase compared to the competition and included an advanced I6 engine with seven main bearings, larger brakes than even the Packard 6, as well as a "seamless one-piece all-steel body" which was the precursor to unitized-construction introduced to the mass-market by the 1941 Nash 600. The 400 was available a four-door sedan, two-door Victoria sedan, three- or (with rumble seat) five-passenger coupe, and a three-passenger Cabriolet.

For 1938, the model became simply the "Nash LaFayette", and the LaFayette line continued as Nash's lowest-priced offering through 1940.

For 1941, the LaFayette was replaced by the all-new unibody Nash 600.

== See also ==
- List of automobile manufacturers
