= Nils Erik Wahlberg =

Automotive engineer and innovator

- Born: August 10, 1885; Johannes, Finland (now Sovetsky, Leningrad Oblast)
- Died: January 20, 1977 (aged 91); Washington, D.C.
- Occupation: Automobile engineer
- Years active: 1910–1952
- Employers: General Motors; Nash Motors

Nils Erik Wahlberg (10 August 1885 – 20 January 1977) was a Finnish-American engineer and automotive pioneer who served as vice president of engineering at Nash Motors for over three decades.

His career included numerous technical and design innovations that distinguished Nash vehicles in the American market.

== Life ==
Wahlberg was born in Johannes, Finland (now in Russian territory), of Finland-Swedish parents. In the middle of his technical studies in the Polytechnic School of Helsinki (now Helsinki University of Technology), he had to flee from the Russification of Finland and being drafted into the Russian Imperial Army. He completed his engineering degree in 1907 at the Ecole Polytechique in Zurich (now ETH Zurich - Federal Institute of Technology Zurich) in Switzerland.

Wahlberg emigrated to the United States in 1909. He settled near Detroit, and his first employer was Maxwell-Briscoe as a draftsman and designer. He moved to Packard and in 1913 to Oakland Motor Car Company (a division of General Motors) as the head of engineering.

In June 1918, Wahlberg received a commission as a major in the United States Army Quartermaster Corps and went overseas during World War I. He was promoted to chief engineer at Oakland and began an association with General Motors' president, Charles W. Nash.

Nash resigned from the presidency of General Motors to start his enterprise, Nash Motors, in Kenosha, Wisconsin, in 1916. In August, Wahlberg followed Nash to the new company. Wahlberg became head Nash's engineering activities.

The first cars developed under Nash's leadership were the 1918 Nash 680 series. They were aimed at the middle of the market and incorporated Wahlberg's innovations that included flow-through ventilation to keep the air fresh inside and advanced overhead (valve-in-head) straight six-cylinder engines. The new cars were characterized as "simplicity of design" and they earned rave reviews.

When Nash formed Nash-Kelvinator in 1937, moving the corporate headquarters to Detroit, Wahlberg remained at the company's main automobile factory in Kenosha, commuting from his home in Chicago. The innovations incorporated in the prewar Nash cars included "out-of-the-box thinking that defined Kenosha's later offerings".

Nash-Kelvinator produced helicopters and aircraft engines during World War II, and Wahlberg had access to a wind tunnel. His work convinced him of the benefits of aerodynamic designs that were introduced in two new postwar Nash models in 1949. They represented "the first all-out attempts at streamlining since the Chrysler Airflow debacle fifteen years earlier."

Wahlberg retired from Nash in 1952 and moved to Washington, DC in 1957.

He died on 19 January 1977, at Georgetown University Hospital, and was buried in Rock Creek Cemetery.

== Nash Motors ==
Charles W. Nash made Wahlberg the vice president for engineering and research. This resulted in "Nash automobiles quickly gained a reputation for durability, reliability, and engineering excellence."

Under his leadership spanning 36 years, the automaker introduced significant automotive innovations:

- Wahlberg's work on the "Twin Ignition" system enabled Nash's six-cylinder engines to meet the output benchmarks of larger straight-eight engines.
- In the early 1920s, Wahlberg pioneered a six-cylinder engine with overhead valves and rubber mounts, improving performance and reducing vibration.
- Wahlberg initiated the groundbreaking structure for mass-produced, popular-priced unibody automobile design.
- Wahlberg developed an integrated heating and ventilation system in the mid-1930s (Weather Eye) for passenger compartment control that became the industry standard. He also perfected the compact air conditioning system housed in the engine compartment rather than using trunk space.
- Wahlberg emphasized aerodynamics. He was the primary force behind the unique design of the 1949 Nash Airflyte series, which featured a distinctive rounded "envelope" body and enclosed wheel arches. This design was developed using wind tunnel testing, a scientific approach rarely applied to mass-produced passenger cars at the time.
- Wahlberg's focus on practicality led to several ergonomic and comfort-oriented innovations. The swept-away dashboard provided more space for front-seat passengers. Car seats could be folded down into a double bed. An integrated instrument pod on the steering column - "Uniscope" - placed gauges directly in front of the driver.
- He led the development of the first successful American compact car, the 1950 Nash Rambler.
- Nash became the first American automaker to offer seat belts in their cars, starting with the 1950 models. Including padded dashboards also demonstrated Wahlberg's pioneering interest in occupant safety.

He was a brilliant man, always seemed deep in thought, as if working on an engineering problem... ~ William E. Reddig, assistant director of styling at Nash and styling director at Kelvinator
