= Nash Airflyte =

Index for the Airflyte name for several cars made by Nash Motors

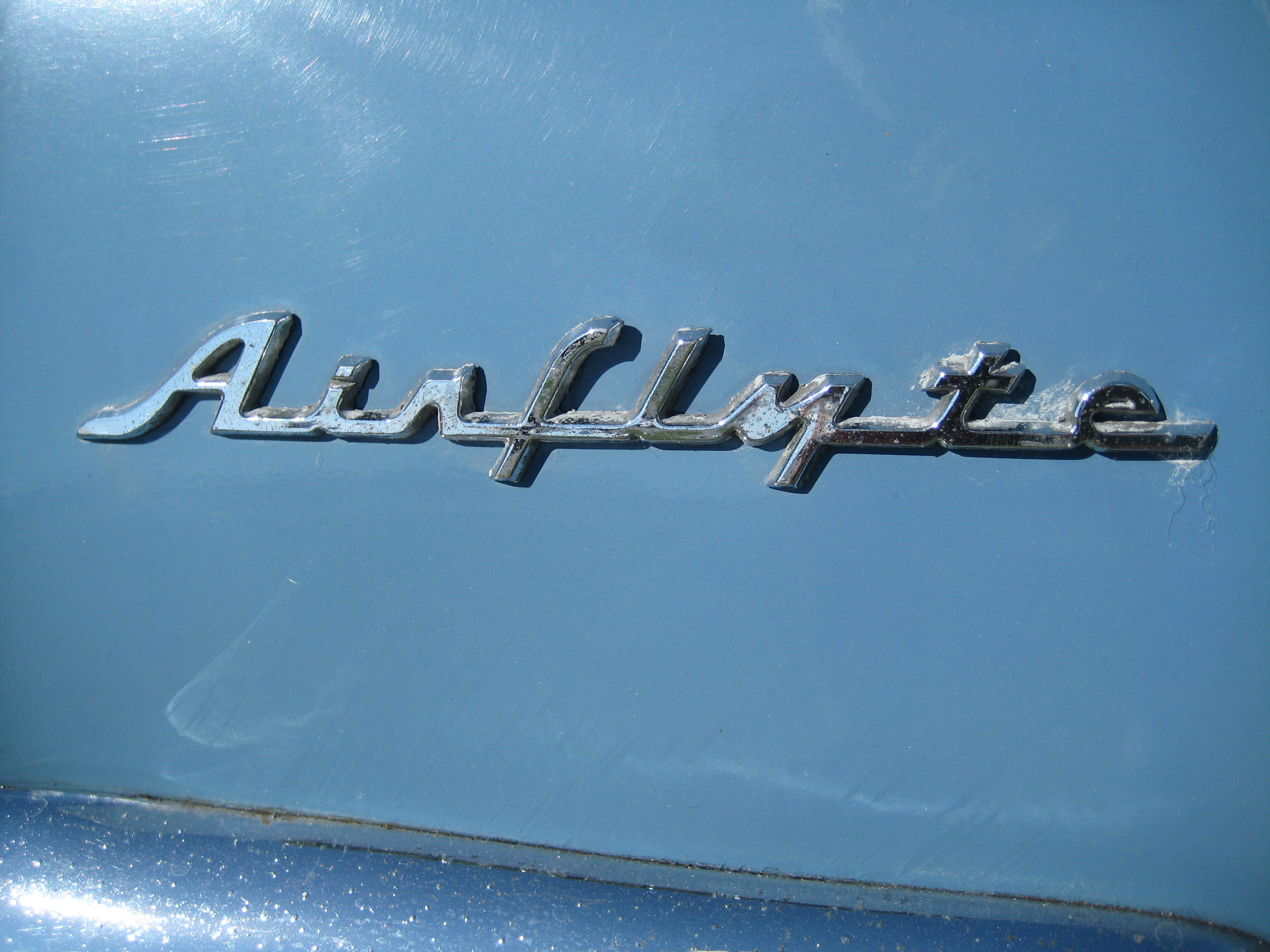
Airflyte badge on a 1950 Nash Statesman

Nash Motors used the Airflyte name for several cars from 1949 until 1955. The automaker also distributed the Nash Airflyte Magazine during that time.

== Models under the Airflyte brand ==
- 1949-1951: Full-size cars characterized by an aerodynamic, rounded shape.

The models within this series included:

- Nash 600(renamed Statesman in 1950)
- Nash Ambassador

- 1950-1955: Compact-sized Nash Rambler
- 1952-1954: The full-size cars were restyled and initially dubbed "Golden Airflytes" to celebrate Nash Motors' 50th anniversary in 1952. These models adopted a more squared-off look than the earlier Airflytes, including larger wheel cutouts in the front fenders.

== Airflyte magazine ==
The Nash Airflyte Magazine was a publication of the Nash Motor Company in the 1950s. Distributed to owners of Nash cars, it featured content about lifestyles, experiences, and travels, in addition to the vehicles they drove.
