= Nash-Kelvinator =

American appliance company (1937-1954)

Nash-Kelvinator Corporation
- Industry: Automotive; Major appliances
- Predecessor: Nash Motors; Kelvinator Corporation
- Founded: 2 January 1937; 89 years ago
- Defunct: 4 July 1954; 72 years ago
- Fate: Consolidated into American Motors
- Successor: American Motors Corporation (AMC)
- Headquarters: Detroit, Michigan
- Products: Automobiles; Military components; Major home appliances; Commercial refrigeration

Nash-Kelvinator Corporation was the result of a merger in 1937 between Nash Motors and Kelvinator Appliance Company. The union of these two companies was brought about as a result of a condition made by George W. Mason prior to his appointment as CEO of Nash. The company manufactured cars and refrigerators as well as aeronautic components and helicopters during World War II. In 1954, the company merged with Hudson Motors to form American Motors Corporation (AMC).

== History ==
The founder of Nash Motors, Charles W. Nash, now serving as chair of the board, wanted George W. Mason for his expertise as a production engineer for several car manufacturers before being appointed president of Kelvinator in 1928. To have Mason, Nash had to buy Kelvinator, a leading manufacturer of refrigerators. The merged company began on 2 January 1937 with no debt and $50 million in cash assets. Mason then served as president of Nash-Kelvinator until 1954 when the firm merged with Hudson Motors.

Nash-Kelvinator ranked 27th among United States corporations in the value of World War II production contracts. As part of the Arsenal of Democracy, the company shifted its factories to make a large variety of military components and aeronautic assemblies. The company expanded its facilities to produce the Hamilton Standard propellers to become the largest manufacturer of this type of propeller with more than 158,000 units made with an additional over 85,000 spare blades, assembling nearly 17,000 Pratt & Whitney R-2800 Double Wasp 18-cylinder, air-cooled aircraft engine, making the newly introduced Sikorsky R-6 helicopters, and becoming one of the largest suppliers of binoculars in the world with over 200,000 delivered to the U.S. Army. Starting in late 1944, the company began to work on new car designs and by 1945 it completed new proving grounds in Wisconsin.

In 1955, Kelvinator introduced the Kelvinator Food-A-Rama Side-by-Side Refrigerator, one of the earliest modern side-by-side frost-free refrigerators. Kelvinator consumer products, before and after the merger with Nash, were considered an upmarket brand of household appliances.

In 1954, Nash-Kelvinator acquired Hudson Motor Car Company of Detroit, Michigan, in what was called a mutually beneficial merger that formed the American Motors Corporation. It was the largest corporate consolidation to date. Kelvinator continued as a wholly owned division that was focused on the production and marketing of major home appliances and refrigeration equipment within the new company.

Seeking to focus on the automobile market, AMC sold the rights to the Kelvinator brand to White Consolidated Industries in 1968, which brought the product under its corporate appliance group, joining the White-Westinghouse, Gibson, and Frigidaire appliance brands. The appliance division of White Consolidated Industries is now part of Sweden's Electrolux Corporation. The Kelvinator brand is applied to household appliances and scientific refrigeration systems.
