= Monarch (automobile) =

Defunct American motor vehicle manufacturer

Monarch Motor Car Company
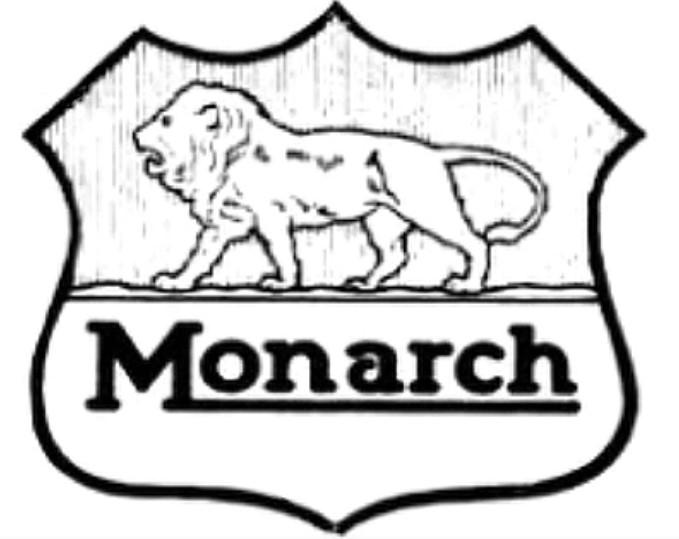
- The Car with the Silver Wheels
- Company type: Automobile manufacturing
- Industry: Automotive
- Founded: 1913; 113 years ago
- Founder: Joseph Bloom
- Defunct: 1916; 110 years ago
- Fate: Bankrupt
- Headquarters: Aurora, Illinois, United States
- Key people: Joseph Bloom, Robert Hupp
- Products: Vehicles; Automotive parts

The Monarch was an automobile built in Detroit, Michigan by the Monarch Motor Car Company from 1913 to 1916.

== History ==
Joseph Bloom founded the company in the spring of 1913 and by August, the company moved into the former Carhartt Motor Car Company factory. The Monarch was designed by Bloom's brother-in-law Robert C. Hupp, formerly with Hupmobile.

The 4-cylinder 16-hp car sold as a runabout or touring car with a Renault style hood were priced at $1,050, equivalent to $34,205 in 2025. Production commenced later that year and 150 had been produced by spring of 1914. In 1914, a smaller 4-cylinder car was added, selling for $675. The Monarch was called "The Car with the Silver Wheels" in company advertisements.

Hupp designed a larger vehicle with a 4.6L V8 engine. The five-passenger open model weighed 3,000 lb (1,400 kg) and was priced at $1,500, equivalent to $47,738 in 2025. It was equipped with a Continental Six engine. The new V8 Monarch entered production in 1915, but production could not be sustained, as new investment never materialized.

Monarch Motors was declared bankrupt in the spring of 1916. Assets were declared to be $20,833 and liabilities $5,753 but they had no cash to operate. By November, rights to the Monarch had been purchased by the Carter Brothers of Hyattsville, Maryland. The V8 as well as a 12-cylinder model already developed in prototype form by Hupp would be continued, but when the cars went on sale in 1917, they were called C.B.s by the new owners.

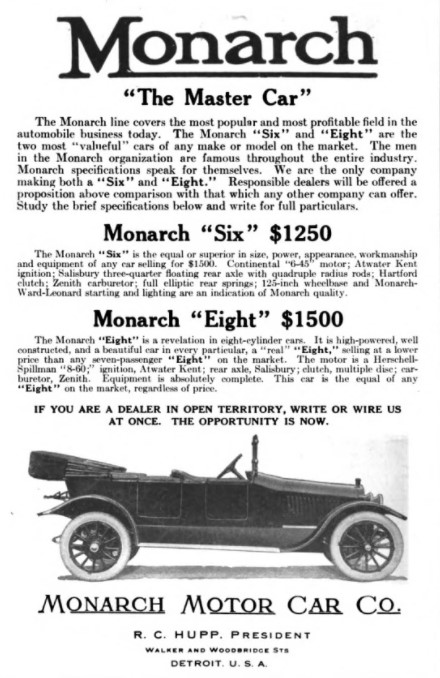
1915 Monarch advertisement

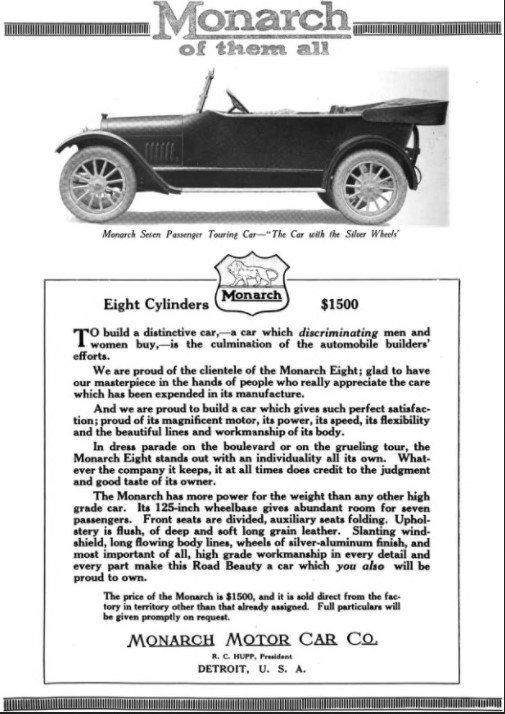
1915 Monarch V8 advertisement
