= Hupp =

Hupp may refer to:

- Hupp (surname)
- Hupp, former name of DeSabla, California
- The Hupp Motor Car Company
- Hupp House, historic house in Strasburg, Virginia
