= Carhartt (disambiguation) =

Carhartt may refer to:

== Surname ==
- Elaine Carhartt (born 1951), an American ceramist.

== Companies ==
- Carhartt, Inc., an American clothing company founded in 1889 by Hamilton Carhartt
- The Carhartt, an American automobile manufactured in Detroit, Michigan, by the Carhartt Automobile Company, from 1911 to 1912.
