= Hupmobile Model R =

Hupmobile Model R Hupmobile Skylark
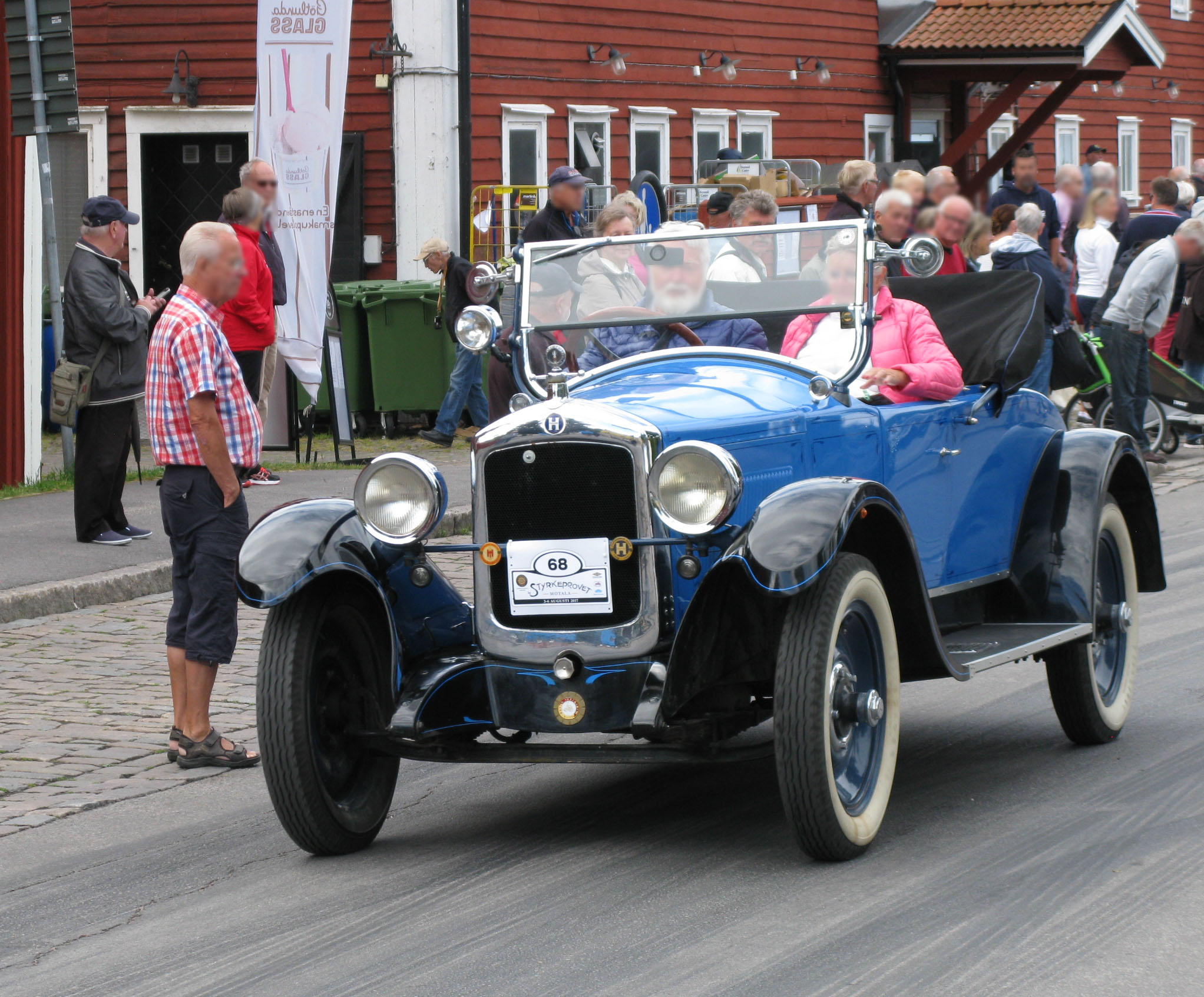
- An original Model R, not a Skylark

Overview
- Manufacturer: Hupp Motor Car Company
- Also called: Skylark; 14/15 HP; Junior Six
- Production: 1916-1925; 1938-1940
- Model years: 1917-1925; 1938-1942

Body and chassis
- Body style: Touring; Phaeton; Roadster; 2-door Sedan; 4-door Sedan; 2-door Coupe; 3-door "Opera Coupe"; 3-door sedan 2-Door Convertible
- Layout: Front Engine, RWD
- Platform: Hupmobile Model N

Powertrain
- Engine: See table
- Transmission: 3-speed Sliding Gear (Manual)

Dimensions
- Wheelbase: 115 in (2,921 mm)

Chronology
- Predecessor: Hupmobile Model N
- Successor: Hupmobile Model E

The Hupmobile Model R was a vehicle produced by the Hupp Motor Company. It is the 18th car introduced by Hupmobile and marks the company's return from luxury cars to entry-level cars. The car would be a short-wheelbase version of the Model N, being 15 in (381.0 mm) shorter, and only for the 1924 and 1925 model Year being available with the main Inline 8 engine.

== Generation History ==
The original car would have 3 generations. The first, and original Model R would be called as the "14/15 HP" generation, being sold with Touring and Phaeton bodies. The second and third Model R would be would not have unique generational names, but would vary from the 14/15 greatly. The second generation would have a up-stroked engine, from a 3.0L up to 3.2L, and the car would be slightly larger than the 14/15 HP, the car would be available with a unique for the time Liftback 2 door, and new for Hupmobile Sedan, Coupe, and Convertible variations. The third generation would very even farther, using the Model N Inline 8 engine, this car would lose the Coupe variant, and would revert to only Sedan and Convertible variants.

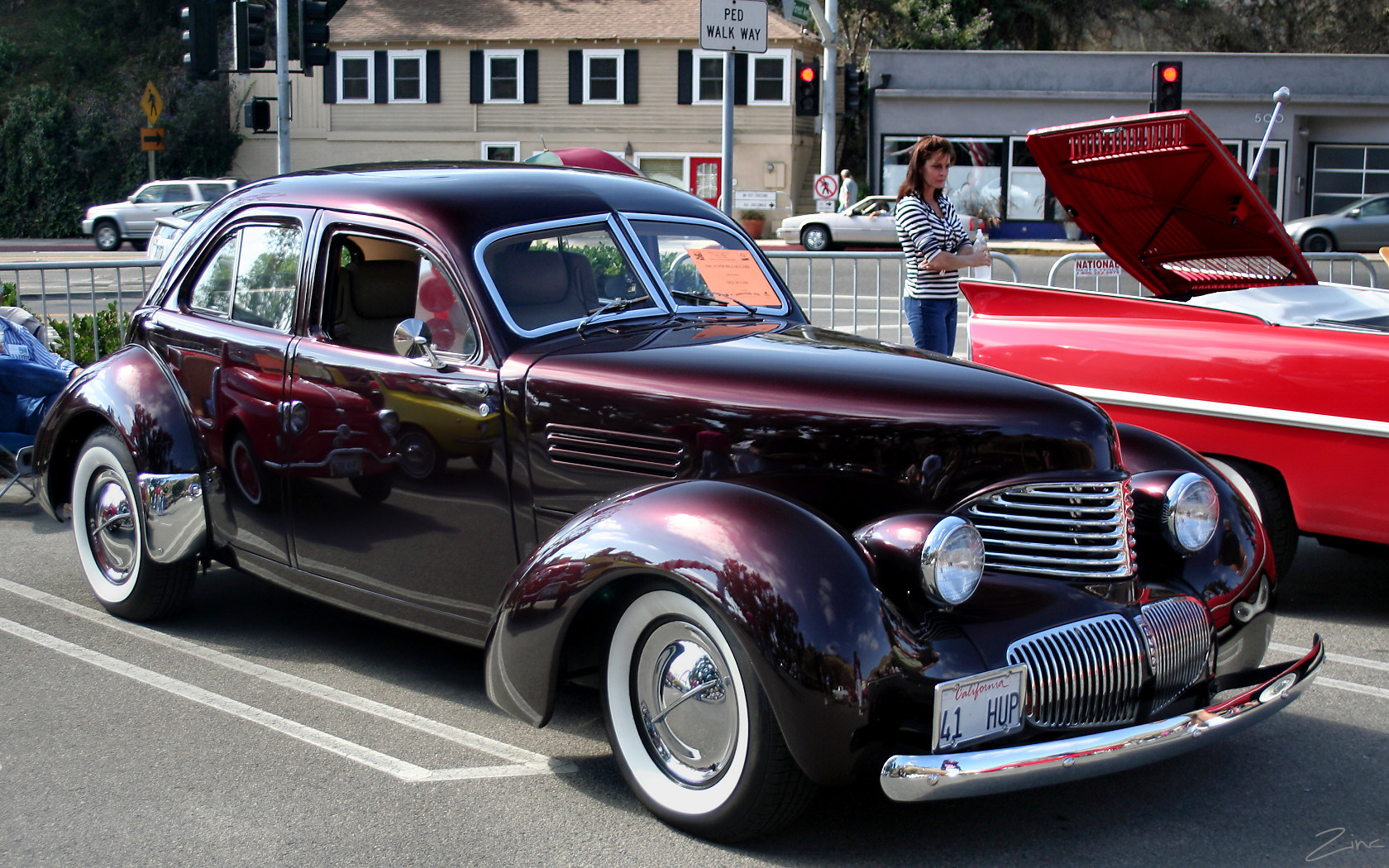
a 1941 model year Skylark

== Skylark ==
The later and final Hupmobile Skylark was often called "Model R" because the internal code for it was Model R. The Skylark was conceived as a last-ditch effort by Hupmobile as their sales crumbled with the beginning of World War II. The Body was a facelifted version of the Cord 810/812, designed by John Tjaarda, who was also contracted to design the engines and running gear. Hupmobiles lack of resources would bring them to contract Graham-Paige to build the bodies. The car would have 2,158 built, with 319 built by Hupmobile, and 1,859 by Graham-Paige.

== Model Directory ==
Generation	Body Name	Years	Price New	Engine	Displacement	Horsepower	Horsepower RPM	Torque	Torque RPM	Length	Width	Height	Weight
1 (14/15 HP)	Touring	1917-1920	$1225	Inline-4	182.5 cu in (2,991 cc)	14 hp (10 kW)	3,200	22 lb⋅ft (30 N⋅m)	1,900	149 in (3,785 mm)	71 in (1,803 mm)	61 in (1,549 mm)	1,800 lb (816 kg)
1 (14/15 HP)	Phaeton	1917-1920	$1225	Inline-4	182.5 cu in (2,991 cc)	15 hp (11 kW)	3,200	22 lb⋅ft (30 N⋅m)	1,900	147.5 in (3,746 mm)	72.3 in (1,836 mm)	69 in (1,753 mm)	1,920 lb (871 kg)
2	2-door Roadster	1920-1924	$1225	Inline-4	196.2 cu in (3,215 cc)	39 hp (29 kW)	3,200	55 lb⋅ft (75 N⋅m)	1,900	150.2 in (3,815 mm)	69.7 in (1,770 mm)	65 in (1,651 mm)	2,000 lb (907 kg)
2	2-Door Sedan	1920-1924	$1225	Inline-4	196.2 cu in (3,215 cc)	39 hp (29 kW)	3,200	55 lb⋅ft (75 N⋅m)	1,900	150.2 in (3,815 mm)	69.8 in (1,773 mm)	69 in (1,753 mm)	2,850 lb (1,293 kg)
2	2-Door Coupe	1920-1924	$1350	Inline-4	196.2 cu in (3,215 cc)	39 hp (29 kW)	3,200	59 lb⋅ft (80 N⋅m)	2,250	150.2 in (3,815 mm)	69.7 in (1,770 mm)	69 in (1,753 mm)	1,500 lb (680 kg)
2	3-Door "Opera Coupe"	1920-1924	$1350	Inline-4	196.2 cu in (3,215 cc)	47 hp (35 kW)	4,000	65 lb⋅ft (88 N⋅m)	2,500	160.2 in (4,069 mm)	73 in (1,854 mm)	69 in (1,753 mm)	1,500 lb (680 kg)
2	3-Door Sedan	1920-1924	$1350	Inline-4	196.2 cu in (3,215 cc)	47 hp (35 kW)	4,000	65 lb⋅ft (88 N⋅m)	2,500	160.2 in (4,069 mm)	73 in (1,854 mm)	73 in (1,854 mm)	2,850 lb (1,293 kg)
3	4-Door Sedan	1924-1925	$1375	Inline-8	269 cu in (4,405 cc)	63 hp (47 kW)	2,800	85 lb⋅ft (115 N⋅m)	2,500	152.8 in (3,881 mm)	69.7 in (1,770 mm)	65 in (1,651 mm)	2,850 lb (1,293 kg)
3	2-Door Convertible	1924-1925	$1375	Inline-8	269 cu in (4,405 cc)	63 hp (47 kW)	2,800	85 lb⋅ft (115 N⋅m)	2,500	152.8 in (3,881 mm)	69.3 in (1,760 mm)	65 in (1,651 mm)	1,800 lb (816 kg)
4 (Skylark)	Skylark 4-door Sedan	1938-1940	$1740	Inline-6	245 cu in (4,015 cc)	101 hp (75 kW)	3,600	141 lb⋅ft (191 N⋅m)	3,000	152.8 in (3,881 mm)	79.9 in (2,029 mm)	61 in (1,537 mm)	3,200 lb (1,451 kg)
4 (Skylark)	Skylark 4-door Convertible	1938-1940	$1740	Inline-6	245 cu in (4,015 cc)	101 hp (75 kW)	3,600	141 lb⋅ft (191 N⋅m)	3,000	152.8 in (3,881 mm)	79.9 in (2,029 mm)	59 in (1,486 mm)	2,900 lb (1,315 kg)

== See also ==
- Hupmobile
