= Weather Eye =

Automotive HVAC system

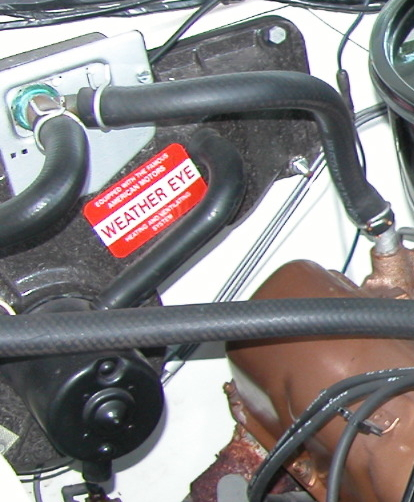
Weather Eye system on firewall of a 1967 AMC Marlin

The Weather Eye was a trade name for a Nash Motors-designed fresh-air system for automobile passenger compartment heating, cooling, and ventilating.

The Nash "All-Weather Eye" was the first automobile air conditioning system for the mass market. The use of the Weather Eye name for automobile passenger heating and air conditioning systems continued in American Motors Corporation (AMC) vehicles.

The design principles of the Nash Weather Eye system are now in use by nearly every motor vehicle.

== Conditioned Air System ==
In 1938, Nash Motors developed the first automobile heater warmed by hot engine cooling water and using fresh air. A control knob controlled ventilation in summer and heating in winter.

Automotive heaters for the passenger compartment of closed cars at that time were simple space heaters of a recirculation type. Most were mounted under front seat with coils for the engine coolant, some were gasoline-fired, and others using engine manifold exhaust heat. The systems had no provision for fresh outside air and most lacked a fan to move the air. Ventilation for the car's cabin was provided by opening a window or even the windshield.

The innovative "Conditioned Air System" is characterized by a cowl-mounted outside air receiver that passes fresh air through a heater core utilizing hot engine coolant for a heat source. The Nash system also pioneered the use of slight pressurization within the passenger compartment to eliminate the infiltration of cold outside air during winter use. This was a fan-boosted filtered ventilation and heating for the passengers, not the modern meaning of an "air conditioning" system. Nash was also the first automobile to make use of a disposable filter in the air-intake to clean incoming air.

This was the first car heater that used fresh air from the outside, and it was advertised as "No dust to soil or spoil your trip! Nash's automatic 'Weather Eye' gives you fresh air, free of dust…rain….insects…chilling drafts!" The Nash system was a significant advancement compared to what was used up to that time: heating by recirculating the air inside the car. Nash also promoted the system's safety feature in eliminating the dangers of carbon monoxide.

Concurrently developed, the Evanair-Conditioner was made by Evans Products Company as an aftermarket accessory. The air was drawn through special hood louvers through a heating coil system mounted on the engine side of the firewall. The Evanair system was available from the factory or installed by a dealership on 1938 and 1939 Hupmobile cars.

== Weather Eye ==
In 1939, Nash added a thermostat to its system, making it the first thermostatic automobile climate control system. The Weather Eye "was the first truly good heating and ventilating system." Additionally, defoggers (defrosters) were incorporated with the introduction of the 3900 series cars that year.

Nils Erik Wahlberg designed the Nash HVAC system, which continues to be the basis for modern automobiles. Nash included the first automatic temperature control for the air side of the heating system, with the thermostat sensing the temperatures of the incoming outside air, the heater's discharge, and the interior of the car; so that a change in any of these three air temperatures resulted in an automatic adjustment to maintain passenger comfort.

Nash was among the first cars to include a heating system as standard equipment The 1950 Nash Rambler compact offered in "Custom" trim with many features that were optional on other cars.

Nash's Conditioned Air System heater was then rebranded as the "Weather Eye." It reflected on the idiom "keep a weather eye open and consumer sales literature explained that the thermostat's "mechanical eye" watched the weather, hence the name.

== All-Weather Eye ==
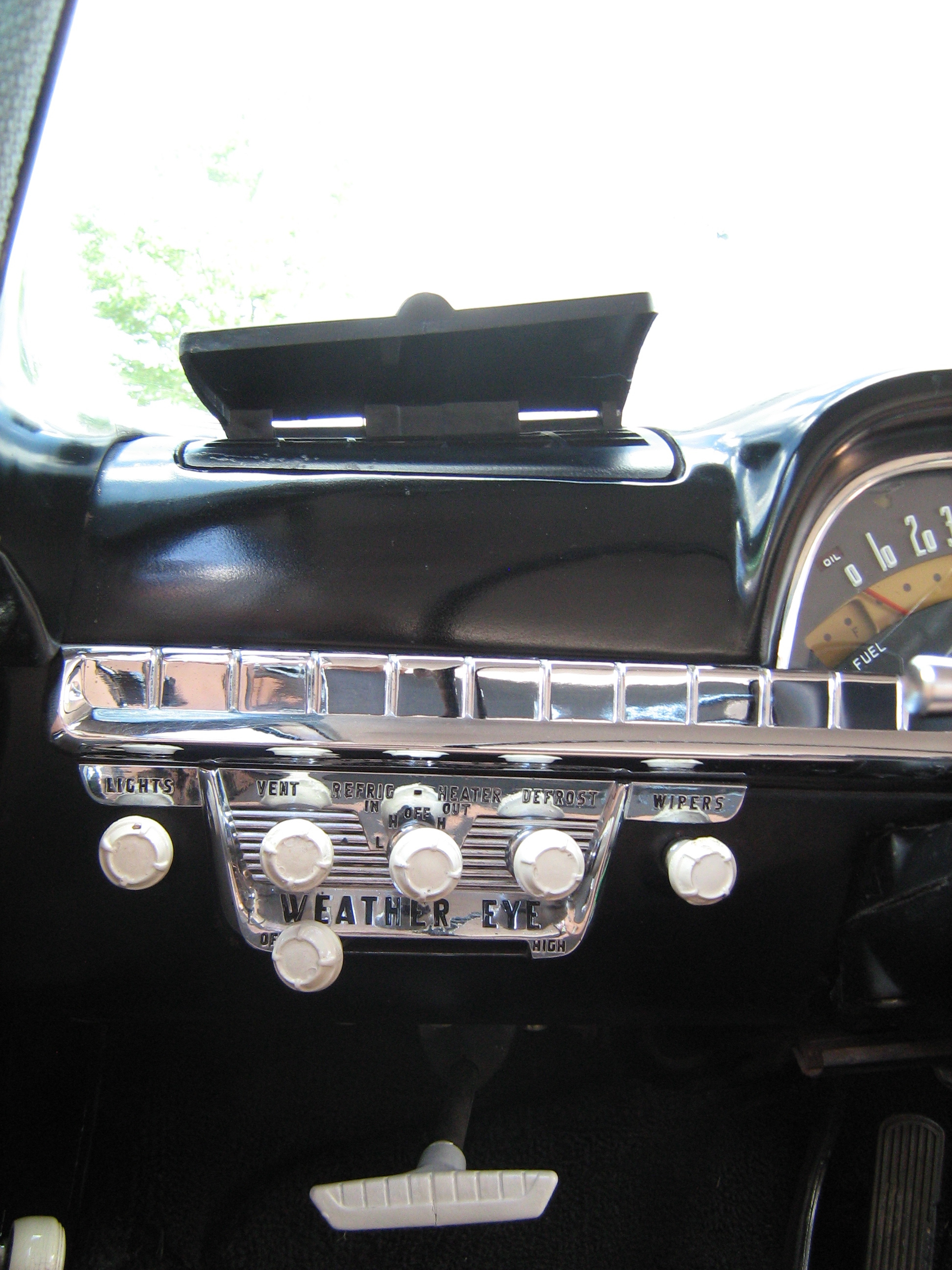
Dash mounted vent and controls for "vent-refrig-heat-defrost" on 1957 Rambler

In 1954, Nash-Kelvinator capitalized on its experience in refrigeration to introduce the automobile industry's first compact and affordable single-unit heating and air conditioning system optional for all Nash Ambassador, Statesman, and Rambler models. It was a true vapor-compression refrigeration system with a compact under the hood and cowl area installation. Combining heating, cooling, and ventilating, the new air conditioning system for the Nash cars was called the "All-Weather Eye".

The 1954 Nash models were the first American automobiles to have a front-end, fully integrated heating, ventilating, and air-conditioning system. This was the first mass-market system with controls on the dash and an electrically engaged clutch.

The Nash system provided cooling in summer and heating in winter by using a single knob with no need to manipulate multiple controls.

This "first true refrigerated air conditioner system" for automobiles was also compact and easily serviceable with all of its components installed under the hood or in the cowl area. With a single thermostatic control, the Nash passenger compartment air cooling option was described as "a good and remarkably inexpensive" system.

Entirely incorporated within the engine bay, the combined heating and cooling system had cold air for passengers to enter through dash-mounted vents. Nash's exclusive "remarkable advance" was not only the "sophisticated" unified system, but also its US$345 price was significantly less than all the other systems. The optional air conditioning system offered by Oldsmobile cost $199 more, and it weighed twice as much as the integrated Nash unit that added only 133 pounds (60 kg) to the car.

A feature was the "desert only" setting on the A/C thermostat, which typically ran the compressor continuously. In humid environments, the evaporator can freeze from accumulated condensation if the compressor runs continuously, ultimately blocking airflow. Lower temperature settings cycle the compressor to prevent this. Freeze-up is not a concern in dry environments such as deserts, and this setting provides constantly cooled airflow into the passenger compartment.

== American Motors ==
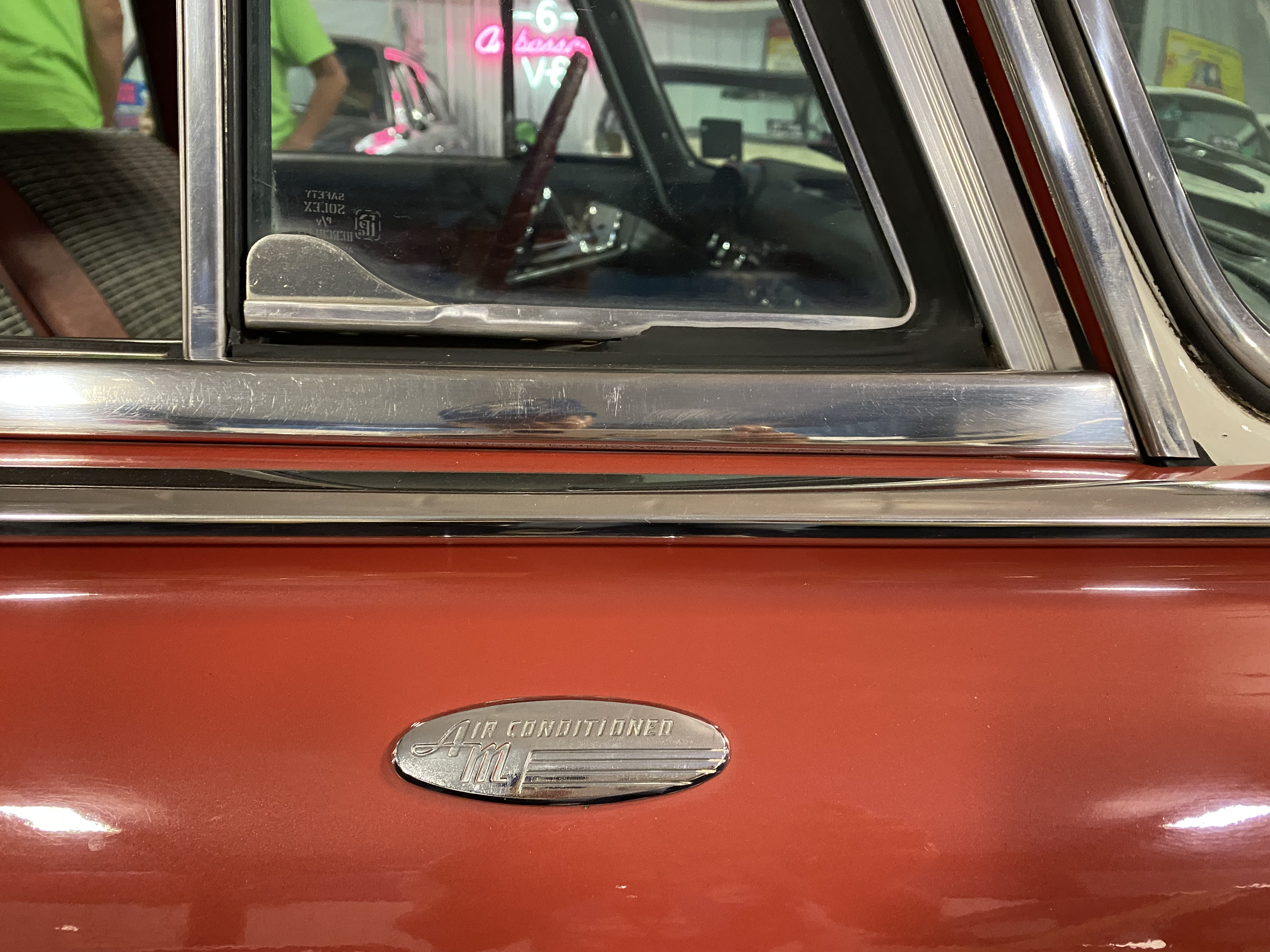
Door-mounted "Air conditioned" emblem on 1961 Rambler Ambassador

Initially as optional equipment and later as a standard feature, AMC continued the Weather Eye system after the merger of Nash-Kelvinator Corporation and Hudson Motor Car Company in 1954. A smaller version of AMC's Weather-Eye heater was included in the sub-compact Metropolitan. Improved versions of the "Weather-Eye" heater, fresh-air ventilation was standard on every 1967 AMC Ambassador.

Starting with the 1968 model year, all AMC Ambassador models came with air conditioning as standard equipment, a feature that at that time still cost extra even on expensive luxury-market Cadillac, Lincoln, and Imperial models, because factory A/C included in a car's base price was only offered by Rolls-Royce and a few other expensive European cars.

Although it was possible to delete this feature by special order, including air conditioning made the Ambassadors "stand out in the crowded full-size market" and the marketing move resulted in increased sales. Effective advertising positioned the AMC Ambassador against the Chevrolet Impala and Ford Galaxie as an unfair comparison because neither of these direct competitors included air conditioning as standard. Instead, the Ambassador was pictured with a Rolls-Royce Silver Shadow because that was a car with standard air conditioning and further comparisons with it pointed out that the Ambassador offered more headroom.

The "Weather Eye" designation was in use for 40 years and was last applied on the 1977 AMC Hornet and the 1978 AMC Gremlin models.
