= 1932 Shubenacadie bank robbery =

Robbery in Nova Scotia, Canada

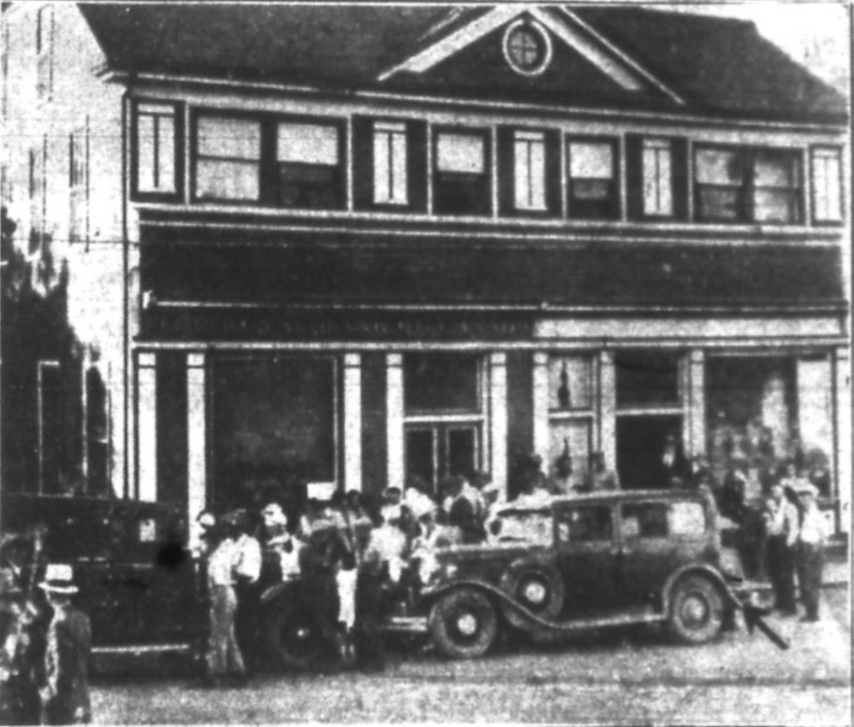
Police officers and reporters gather outside the Royal Bank in Shubenacadie following a botched robbery on 23 August 1932

On 23 August 1932, a botched robbery attempt targeted the Royal Bank of Canada branch in Shubenacadie, Nova Scotia. Orchestrated by the former bank manager Sidney Rafuse, he enlisted his brother-in-law Gerald Freckleton and the petty criminal Edson Boutilier to join him in the robbery. Rafuse planned to distract the employees of the bank while his accomplices stole cash and bonds. The Royal Canadian Mounted Police (RCMP), who had recently replaced the Nova Scotia Police as the provincial police force, were alerted of the plan by Boutilier. The police provided Boutilier with an unloaded gun and a car and attempted to ambush the robbers, resulting in a shootout that left Freckleton dead and Boutilier wounded. Rafuse was arrested and convicted of conspiracy and attempted robbery, receiving a four-year prison sentence. The incident sparked significant public criticism of the RCMP's armed presence in the province.

== Background ==
Sidney Rafuse was from Lunenburg, Nova Scotia. He enlisted in the Canadian Army in 1917, and fought in France where he sustained injuries at the Battle of Fresnoy. He returned to Lunenburg by 1920, and began working as a clerk at the local Royal Bank of Canada branch, later being promoted to manager. After working at the Lunenburg branch for 10 years, Rafuse was transferred to the Sydney branch in 1931, but retired from the position in May 1932; he subsequently begin working as an insurance salesman.

Rafuse's brother-in-law, Gerald Freckleton, lived on Maynard Street in Halifax. He worked a variety of odd jobs such as sorting laundry and driving a taxi. In May 1932, Freckleton began working at the recently opened Rosa Dress Shop on Barrington Street, which his wife Lilian had bought in as a partner at the request of the owner, Gerald Avery. The store never acquired a business license, and Freckleton was arrested for stealing dresses from another store in Truro shortly after Rosa Dress Shop opened.

== Planning and preparation ==
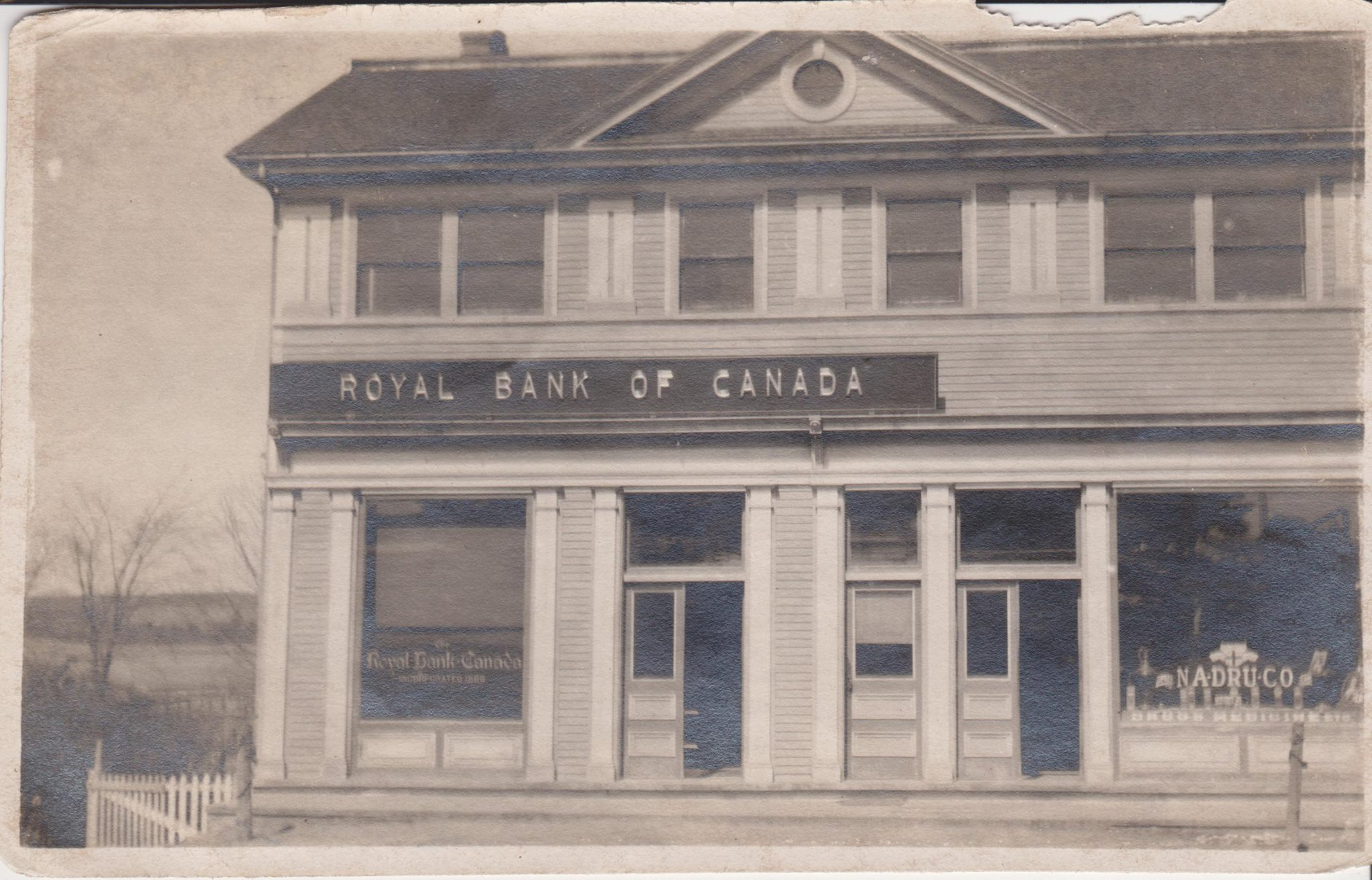
Sidney Rafuse planned to rob the Royal Bank of Canada branch in Shubenacadie

In early August 1932, Sidney Rafuse devised a plan to rob the Royal Bank of Canada branch in Shubenacadie, leveraging his experience as a former bank manager. He enlisted his brother-in-law, Gerald Freckleton, and sought a third accomplice. Rafuse planned to enter the bank under the pretense of selling insurance to distract the manager. He would signal the others to begin the robbery by walking out of the bank, discarding his cigarette, and returning inside. Freckleton and the accomplice would then enter with guns; lock Rafuse and the bank staff in the vault; steal cash, bonds, and bank ledgers; and escape in Rafuse's car, which they would then burn to destroy evidence. Freckleton recruited his friend, Clarence Lyons, who introduced them to Edson Boutilier, a known petty criminal. Freckleton and Rafuse persistently attempted to persuade Boutilier to join them in the robbery, visiting his house on three separate occasions. Boutilier, fearing a 14-year prison sentence for prior crimes, informed the Halifax City Police and the RCMP. The RCMP inspector James Blakeney instructed him to proceed with the plan to catch the robbers in the act, providing him with an unloaded gun and $5 (Note: (equivalent to $109 in 2025)) for fuel. Blakeney suggested that Boutilier steal a car to use in the robbery, but he refused. Blakeney thus arranged for Boutilier to be given a 1928 Hupmobile Eight previously used by the Nova Scotia Police.

== Robbery ==
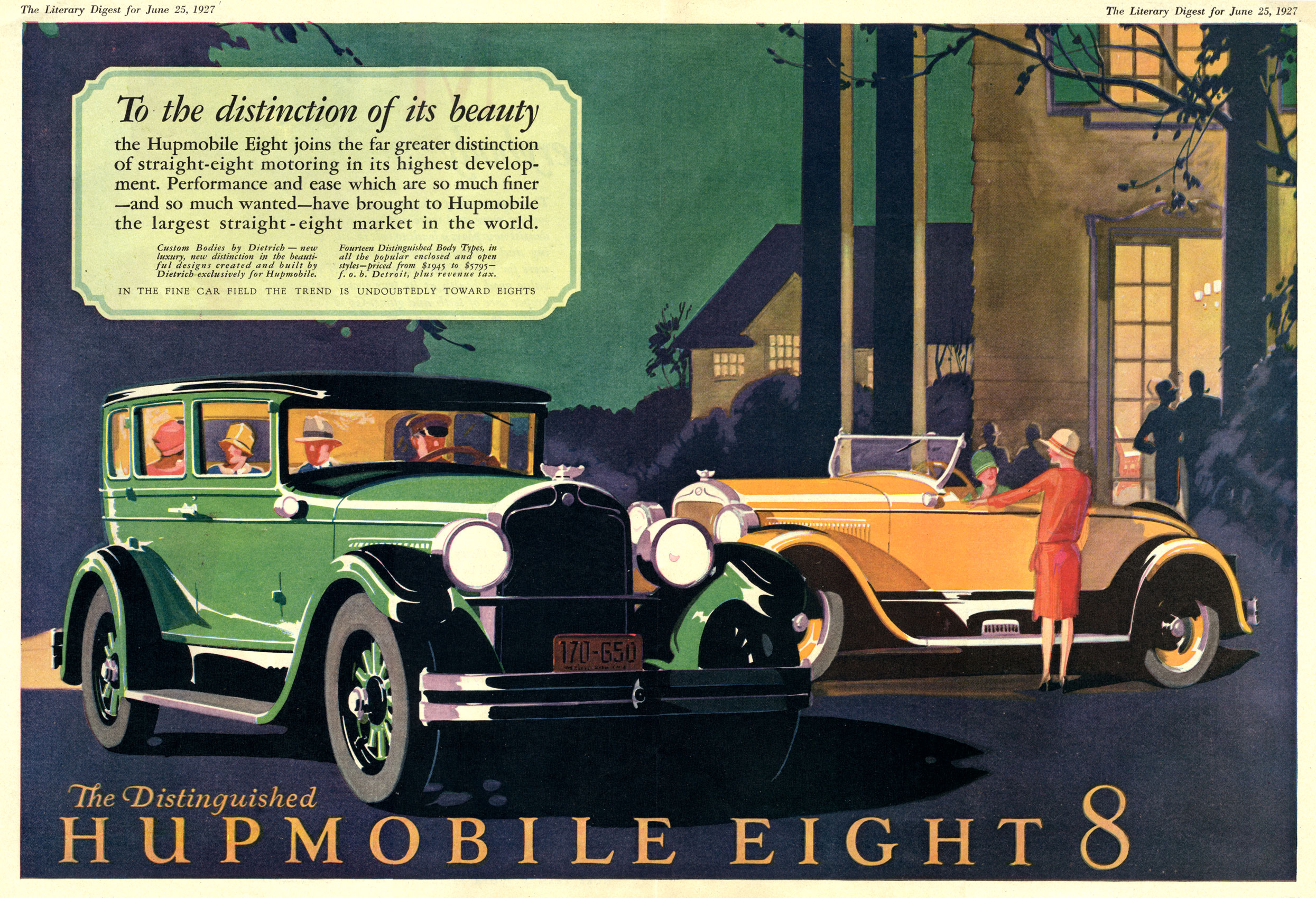
Edson Boutilier was given a 1928 Hupmobile Eight by the RCMP to facilitate the robbery

On 23 August 1932 at 1:00pm, five police officers arrived at the Royal Bank in Shubenacadie to prepare for the robbery. RCMP Inspector James Blakeney, RCMP Corporal Alfred Ball, RCMP Staff Sergeant Leonard Warrior, Halifax City Police Detective Tom Kennedy, and Halifax City Police Constable James Baker hid in a closet at the back of the bank. They waited there for two hours, positioned to intervene. The bank staff included manager William Robertson, teller C. J. Lawlor, and clerk Roy McNeil. Lawlor was given a handgun, but Blakeney removed its ammunition.

At 2:50pm, Sidney Rafuse entered the bank, smoking a cigarette and posing as an insurance salesman. He went into the manager's office with Robertson. Gerald Freckleton and Edson Boutilier, heavily intoxicated after drinking rum and beer, crashed their car into two ditches on their way to the bank, delaying their arrival. At 3:10pm, they parked directly outside the bank, entered with handkerchiefs covering their faces and guns drawn, and demanded cash from Lawlor. Freckleton waved his gun, swore, and fired two shots. The police responded with 10 shots: three from Ball and Warrior, and two from Kennedy and Baker. Blakeney did not fire. Freckleton, struck by multiple bullets, stumbled into the manager's office and died. Boutilier was shot in the shoulder, the bullet piercing his lung; he collapsed while walking towards the front door of the bank, shouting that he had been "double-crossed". Rafuse was left unharmed by the gunfire, and was arrested. Police later found a suitcase in the Hupmobile containing 18 dresses stolen from Rosa Dress Shop the night before the robbery.

== Aftermath ==
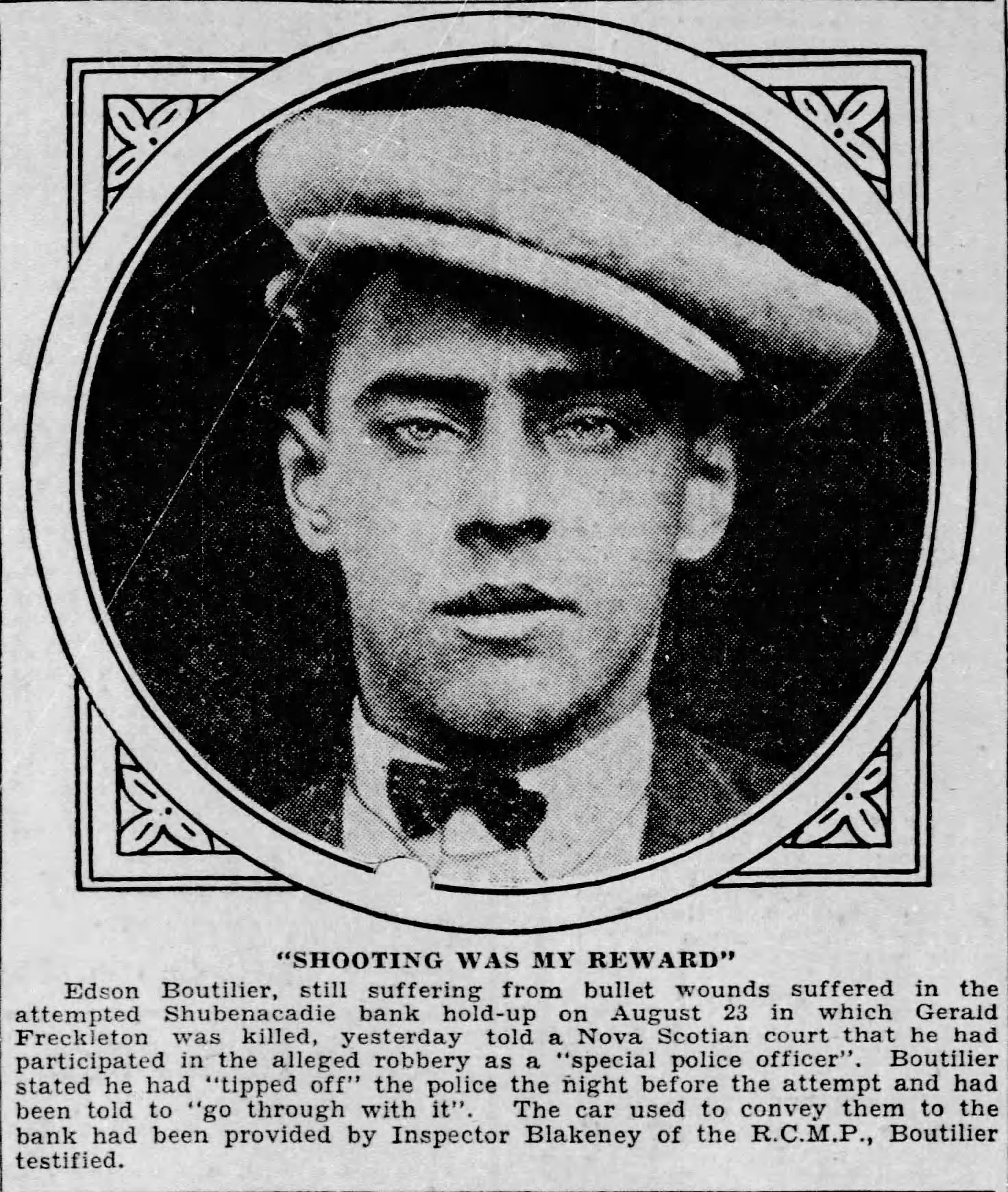
Edson Boutilier pictured in The Toronto Star, 21 September 1932

A preliminary hearing was held for Rafuse on 2 September 1932, while Boutilier was held at a hospital in Truro. The RCMP initially denied that Boutilier's gun was a police weapon. The botched robbery led to a sensational two-day trial starting 21 September 1932 at the Supreme Court in Windsor, drawing a large crowd. Rafuse faced charges of conspiracy to commit an indictable offense, attempted robbery, and attempting to cause grievous bodily harm. The trial received national attention due to RCMP Inspector James Blanekey's decision to involve Boutilier, providing him with a car and an unloaded gun. Boutilier testified that he was appointed as a "special officer" of the RCMP after informing police of the planned robbery. Defense lawyer Gilbert Vernon argued that Freckleton was "shot down in cold blood", and questioned the reliability of witnesses like Boutilier due to their criminal history. Vernon argued that there was no evidence Rafuse was involved with the robbery because he was unarmed. Boutilier's testimony, however, was damning; the jury convicted Rafuse on conspiracy and attempted robbery, but acquitted him on the grievous bodily harm charge, sentencing him to four years in prison. Rafuse served all four years, and by 1939 was living in Halifax with his wife Annie and her mother. He had two sons: Bruce, a Royal Canadian Air Force pilot, and Keith. He died of a heart attack at 43 years old while visiting Sydney on 20 July 1940, and was buried at Fort Massey Cemetery in Halifax.

Freckleton's mother, Annie, filed a complaint against Blakeney and charged him with "having conspired to incite crime". The matter was brought before Magistrate Jacob Barnhill at Police Court on 5 October 1932. After a delay, he heard evidence on 28 October, and acquitted Blakeney on 4 November 1932.

On 10 January 1933, the East Hants Municipal Council recommended that the municipality not pay the outstanding cost of transporting witnesses to the trial. Warden R. H. Gass stated that because "provincial authorities had paid for the ammunition supplied to the so-called robbers", they should be required to pay for costs incurred by the trial.

== Criticism of the RCMP ==
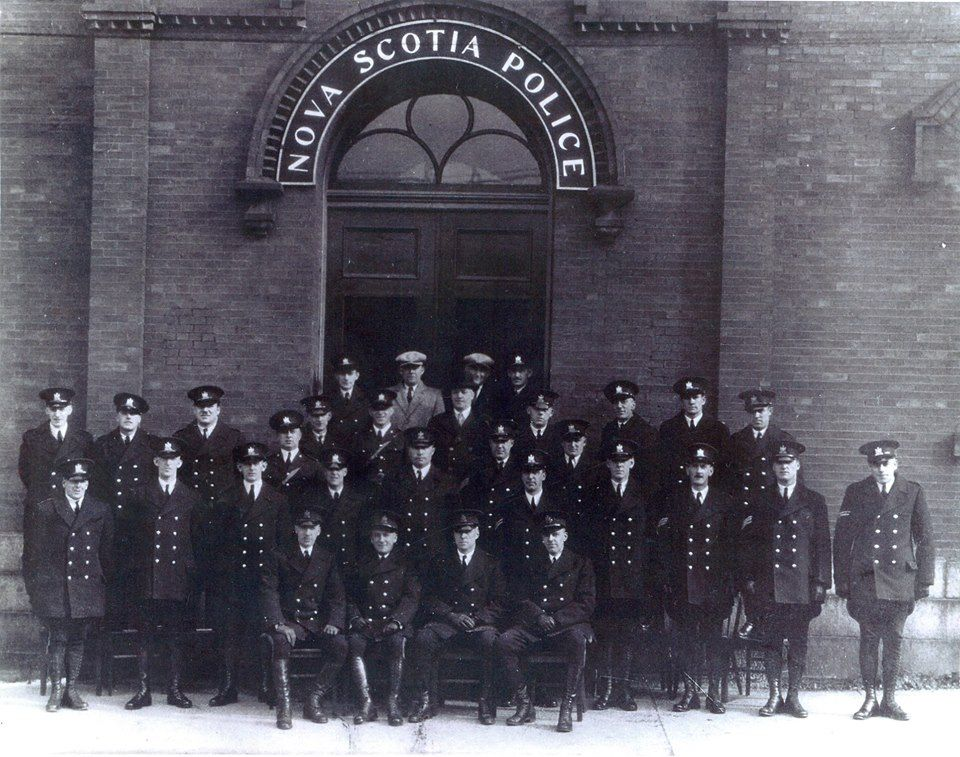
The Nova Scotia Police were replaced by the RCMP as the provincial police force in 1932

The Shubenacadie bank robbery fueled criticism of the RCMP, who replaced the Nova Scotia Police as the province's police force in April 1932. The revelation that the RCMP provided a car and unloaded gun to Edson Boutilier to facilitate the robbery sparked significant public outrage. The Halifax Chronicle, aligned with the Liberal Party, published multiple editorials on disarming the police in the months following the robbery. At a Liberal Party meeting on 13 October 1932, the lawyer Malcolm Alexander Patterson condemned the RCMP's actions. On 22 March 1933, Liberal House Leader Alexander Stirling MacMillan denounced the armed presence of the RCMP, citing the Shubenacadie robbery and other fatal incidents. MacMillan argued that Nova Scotia, as a "law-abiding province", did not require a police force of over 300 officers.

== See also ==
- List of bank robbers and robberies
