= Hupp-Yeats =

Defunct American motor vehicle manufacturer

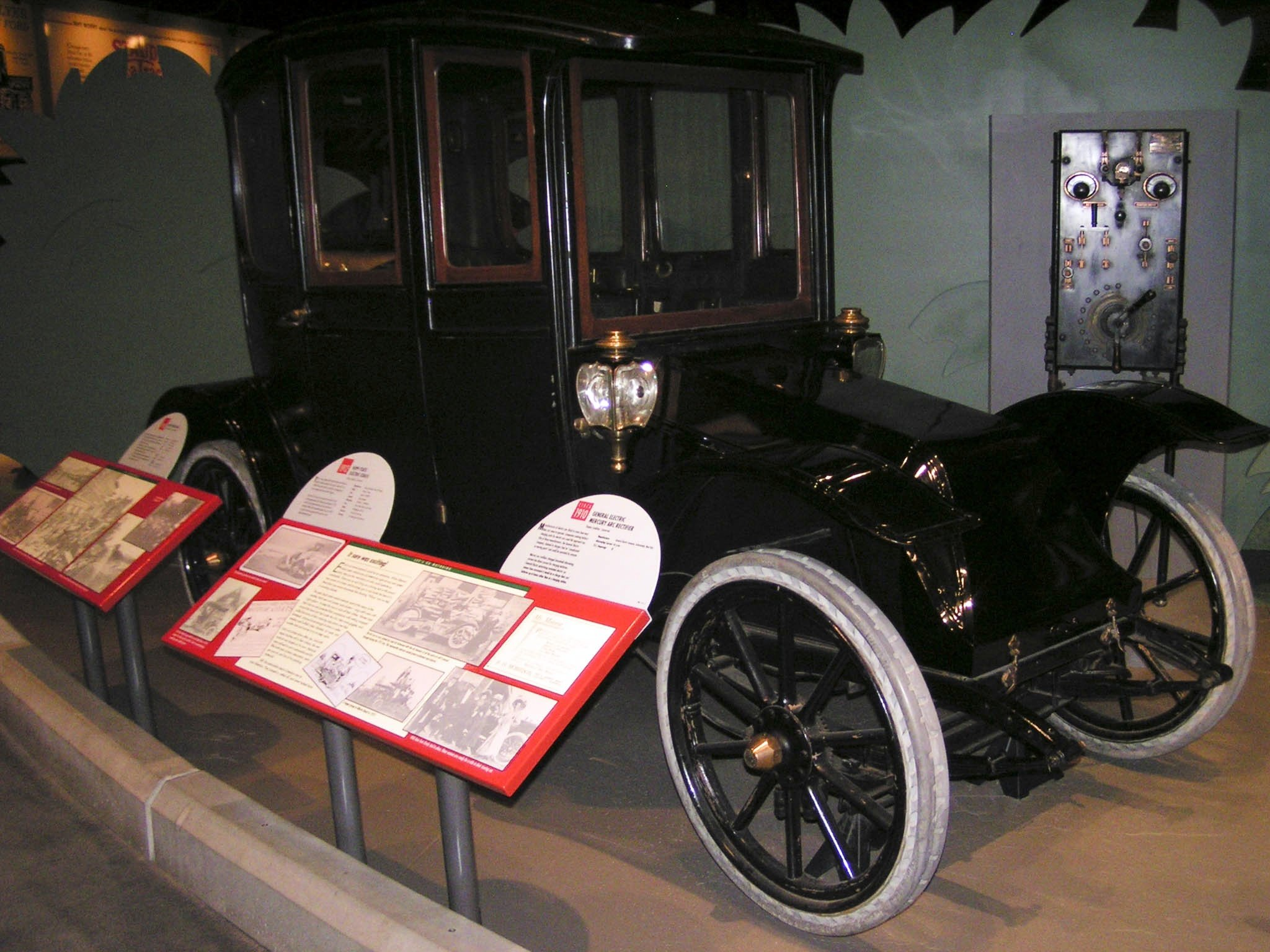
1912 Hupp-Yeats Electric Coach

The Hupp-Yeats was an early American electric car manufactured in Detroit, Michigan from 1911 to 1916. The parent company was begun by Robert Craig Hupp, previously of the Hupp Motor Company as the R.C.H. Corporation through 1912, later becoming the Hupp-Yeats Electric Car Company.

The Hupp-Yeats used Westinghouse motors with five selective speeds. The cars were built as four-seaters in both open and closed models, and came with standard solid rubber tires.

== Legacy ==
Only a few of these cars are still known to exist completely. Most of these are in museums.
