= Hupp (surname) =

Hupp is a surname. Notable people with the surname include:

- Anne Hupp (1757–1823), American frontierswoman
- Bobby Hupp (1877–1931), American automobile engineer and company founder
- Harry Lindley Hupp (1929-2004), American judge
- Jana Marie Hupp (born 1964), American actress
- Otto Hupp (1859–1949), German graphical artist
- Pam Hupp (born 1957/1958), American woman charged with murder
- Suzanna Hupp (born 1959), American politician
