= Nova Scotia Police =

Provincial police force

- Badge of the NSP
- Abbreviation: NSP

Agency overview
- Formed: 1930
- Dissolved: 1932

Jurisdictional structure
- Legal jurisdiction: Provincial

Operational structure
- Headquarters: Halifax

The Nova Scotia Police was the provincial police force of Nova Scotia from 1930 until 1932, when they were replaced by the Royal Canadian Mounted Police (RCMP).

== History ==
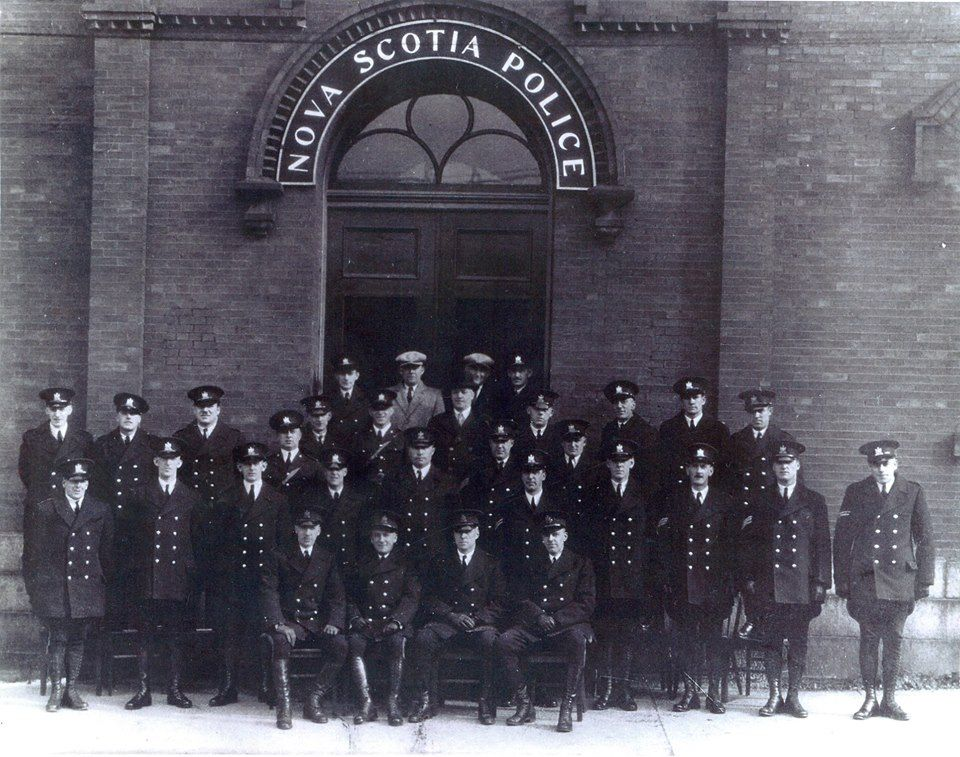
Officers of the Nova Scotia Police in 1930

Nova Scotia passed legislation to allow for the appointment of provincial police officers in 1889. Prohibition legislation in 1921 led to bootlegging and illegal alcohol distribution, and municipalities began employing temperance inspectors. Prohibition in Nova Scotia ended in 1929. Before 1930, provincial police officers were primarily special constables dealing with labour disputes in Cape Breton.

The Nova Scotia Police was formally established in 1930. The official name of the force was chosen because the term "Provincial Police" carried a negative connotation in Cape Breton. The Nova Scotia Police was established primarily to enforce the province's control over the alcohol trade via the Nova Scotia Liquor Control Act, but also enforced the Criminal Code and a variety of provincial and federal statutes. Premier Edgar Nelson Rhodes facilitated the transfer of Staff Sergeant Frederick Arthur Blake from the RCMP to become the Commissioner of the Nova Scotia Police.

Including the Commissioner, the Nova Scotia Police had a total of 98 officers. Most of the officers were assigned across 7 districts: 24 in Halifax County, seven in Bridgewater, nine in Yarmouth, eight in Kentville, eight in Oxford, eight in New Glasgow, and 19 in Sydney. Expecting a high turnover rate, 146 officers were employed by 1931 to sustain a force of 100.

The Nova Scotia Police was disbanded on 1 April 1932, and replaced by the RCMP.

== See also ==
- 1932 Shubenacadie bank robbery
- Alberta Provincial Police
- British Columbia Provincial Police
- Saskatchewan Provincial Police
