= Evanair-Conditioner =

The 1938 Hupmobile Evanair-Conditioner, together with the concurrent Nash Weather Eye, were the automobile industry's first fresh-air hot water heating systems. Kelch fresh-air exhaust heaters had been available on Packard automobiles for several years prior to the introduction of these systems.

The Hupmobile system differed from the better-known Nash system by drawing up to 150 cubic feet (4.2 m^{3}) of fresh outside air per minute through special hood louvers and thence through filters and heating coils into the passenger compartment. The Evanair-Conditioner, unlike the Weather Eye, was mounted entirely within the engine compartment, and the hot-water control switch was mounted on the dashboard. The very similar Weather Eye drew air in through a cowl ventilator, then filtered and heated the air in a unit mounted beneath or within the dashboard.

The then-revolutionary principles of both the Hupmobile Evanair-Conditioner and the Nash Weather Eye are still in use today in nearly every motor vehicle.
