= Bobby Hupp =

American automobile engineer and company founder

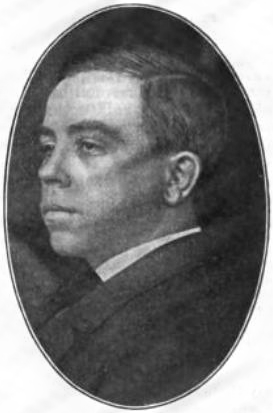
- Born: Robert Craig Hupp; June 22, 1877; Grand Rapids, Michigan
- Died: December 7, 1931 (aged 54); Detroit, Michigan
- Burial place: Woodlawn Cemetery
- Occupation(s): Engineer, businessman

Robert Craig Hupp (June 22, 1877 – December 7, 1931) was an American automobile engineer and businessman who co-founded Hupp Motor Car Company.

== Biography ==
Bobby Hupp was born in Grand Rapids, Michigan, on June 22, 1877. (Note: Historian David Burgess-Wise gives his birth year as 1861.) He worked for Oldsmobile, where he co-designed the Curved Dash runabout. He also worked at Ford Motor Company.

In 1909, he co-founded Hupp Motor Car Company, with Charles Hastings, formerly of Oldsmobile, who put up the first US$8,500 toward manufacturing Hupp's car. They were joined by investors J. Walter Drake, Joseph Drake, John Baker, and Edwin Denby. Drake was elected president; Hupp was vice president and general manager. Emil Nelson, formerly of Oldsmobile and Packard, joined the company as chief engineer. Hastings became assistant general manager.

While serving as vice president and general manager for Hupp Motors, he formed the Hupp-Yeats Electric Car Company in 1910, and acquired a collection of companies to supply parts for Hupmobile and other auto manufacturers. Hupp's expansive business plans met with skepticism by his investors, and in August 1911 they bought him out. Hupp immediately brought out the automobile company RCH. He also combined all of his business enterprises into Hupp Corporation. Fearing confusion between the Hupmobile produced by Hupp Motors and the RCH and Hupp-Yeats produced by Hupp Corporation, Hupp Motors sued Hupp Corporation and the Hupp brothers to force them to change the corporate name. The suit was successful; in early 1912, Hupp Corporation changed its name to R.C.H. Corporation.

When Hupp left Hupp Motors, he informed the company that his supplier companies would devote their full capacity to make parts for RCH.

Hupp, who is credited with many early automotive design inventions including hydraulic braking systems, died of a cerebral hemorrhage at the Detroit Athletic Club on December 7, 1931, following a game of squash. He collapsed in the locker-room, and doctors attending to him were unable to save him. He is buried at Woodlawn Cemetery in Detroit.
