= Elaine Carhartt =

American ceramist (born 1951)

Elaine Carhartt (born 1951) is an American ceramist.

== Biography ==
Carhartt is a native of Grand Junction, Colorado, who has spent much of her career in Pasadena, California. She graduated from Colorado State University with a bachelor of fine arts degree in 1975, and moved to California the next year. She won an award for new talent offered by the Los Angeles County Museum of Art. Stylistically, Carhartt's work is influenced by the traditional ceramics of Turkey and Portugal. Besides freestanding sculptures she produces tile murals and prints.

The Los Angeles County Museum of Art inaugurated an exhibition program titled "Gallery Six" in 1981 with work by Carhartt. Critic William Wilson wrote that its "whimsy is executed with extraordinary attention to the rendering of volumes and the orchestration of its ice cream parlor colors". In the Los Angeles Times, Suzanne Muchnic reviewed a 1985 exhibition that included Carhartt's work, writing that "Carhartt's ceramic figures seem to sprout from some unknown sphere in which circus performers and mythical creatures live together in silent contentment."

== Exhibitions ==
- “Elaine Carhartt: Offering," Offramp Gallery, 2015.
