= Carhartt (automobile) =

Defunct American motor vehicle manufacturer

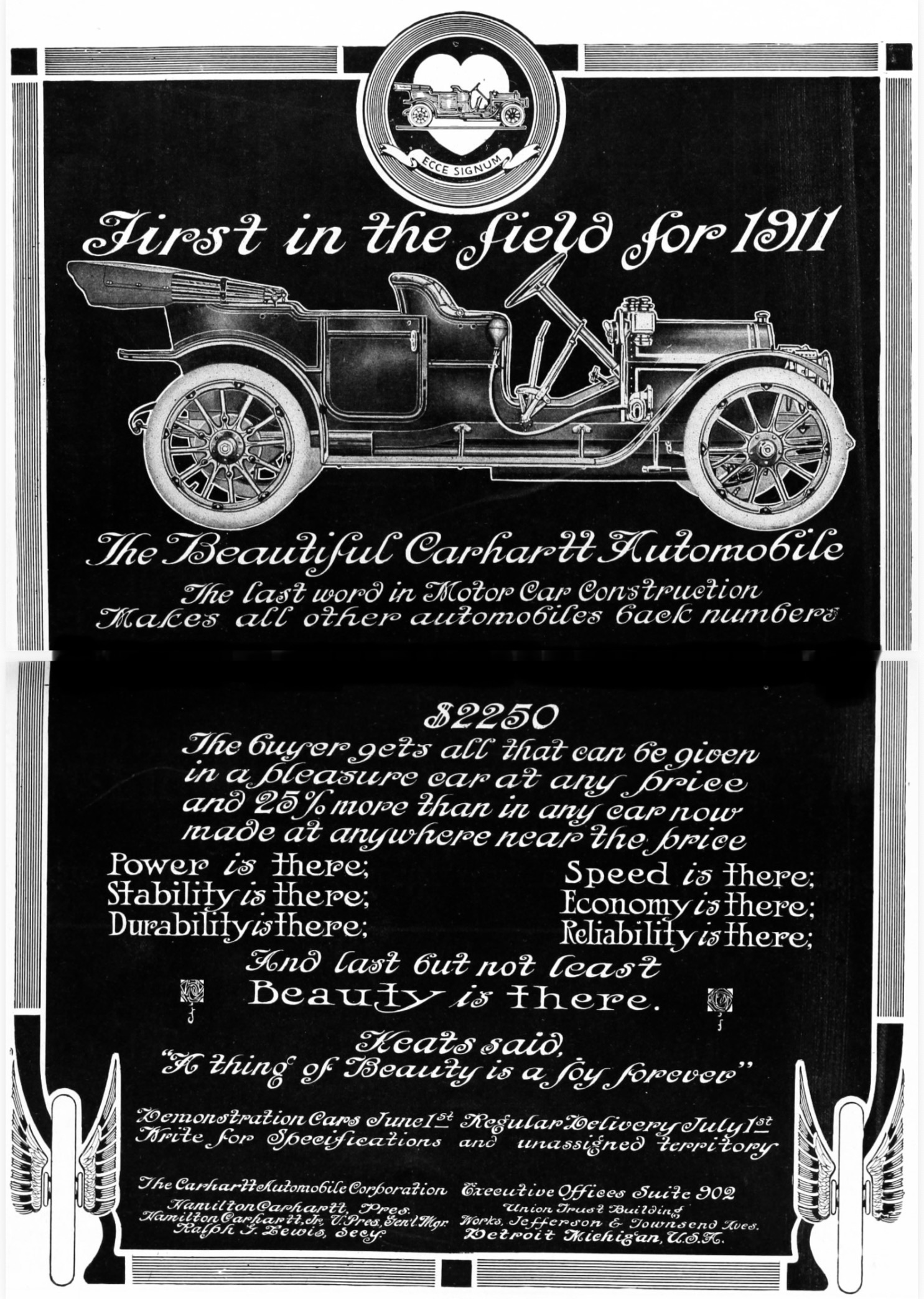
Carhartt Four (July 1910-1911)

The Carhartt was an American automobile manufactured in Detroit, Michigan, by the Carhartt Automobile Company from 1911 to 1912. The company claimed that "28 years of manufacturing success culminates in the Carhartt car," but this was based on the company's expertise in manufacturing overalls.

Two 4-cylinder models were advertised - the Junior 25 hp and Four 35 hp, with the latter having six different body styles, all priced at $2250. In 1912, a 50 hp Four was offered, priced from $2500 to $3500. Very few of these cars were built before Carhartt returned exclusively to the manufacturing of clothing.

== See also ==
- Brass Era car
- Carhartt
