= Hupmobile Model E =

1925 automobile produced by Huppmobile

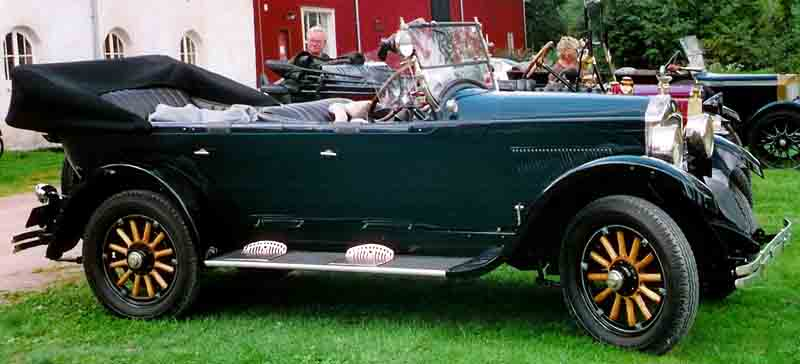
- 1924 Model E Touring, circa December 31, 2006

Overview
- Manufacturer: Hupmobile
- Model years: 1925-1928

Body and chassis
- Body style: Touring car
- Layout: FR layout
- Doors: 2 or 4 Conventional doors

Powertrain
- Engine: See table
- Transmission: 3-speed Manual transmission

Chronology
- Predecessor: Hupmobile Model D
- Successor: Hupmobile Model F

The Hupmobile Model E was the 7th vehicle produced by the Hupp Motor Company.

== History ==
The original Hupmobiles would be aimed at the entry level market, competing against the Ford Model T. The Model E however would be aimed at the top of the mid class automobiles, with their new Inline 8. For the 1925 model year, Hupmobile would come out with the E series, with the prototype showing off a 123.65 cu in (2,026 cc) Inline 4, which would be half of the production engine of the E1. It would come in 3 series, the E1, E2, and E3. The E1 would feature a 247.289 cu in (4,052 cc) Inline 8, the E2, features E1 engine, stroked to, 268.8 cu in (4,405 cc) and the E3 a 291.2 cu in (4,772 cc) Inline 6.

== Specifications ==
| Series | Engine Type | Displacement | Horsepower | Horsepower RPM | Torque | Torque RPM | Weight (For Touring Body) | Length (For Touring Body) | Width (For Touring Body) | Height (For Touring Body) | Wheelbase |
|---|---|---|---|---|---|---|---|---|---|---|---|
| E1 | Inline 8 | 247.289 cu in (4,052 cc) | 60 bhp (60.8 PS; 44.7 kW) | 3,000 | 115 lb⋅ft (155.9 N⋅m) | 1,700 | 1,361 kg (3,000.5 lb) | 145 inches (3,683.0 mm) | 69 inches (1,752.6 mm) | 61 inches (1,549.4 mm) | 115 inches (2,921.0 mm) |
| E2 | Inline 8 | 268.8 cu in (4,405 cc) | 63 bhp (63.9 PS; 47.0 kW) | 2,800 | 120 lb⋅ft (162.7 N⋅m) | 1,800 | 1,387 kg (3,057.8 lb) | 152 inches (3,860.8 mm) | 70.6 inches (1,793.2 mm) | 63.5 inches (1,612.9 mm) | 115 inches (2,921.0 mm) |
| E3 | Inline 6 | 291.2 cu in (4,772 cc) | 45 bhp (45.6 PS; 33.6 kW) | 2,200 | 76 lb⋅ft (103.0 N⋅m) | 1,700 | 1,422 kg (3,135.0 lb) | 165 inches (4,191.0 mm) | 75 inches (1,905.0 mm) | 70 inches (1,778.0 mm) | 118.25 inches (3,003.5 mm) |

== See also ==
- Hupmobile
