= Hupmobile =

Former American car manufacturer

Coordinates: 42.3815°N 83.0343°W

Hupp Motor Car Company
- Type: Automobile Manufacturing
- Industry: Automotive
- Founded: 1909
- Defunct: 1940
- Headquarters: Detroit, Michigan, United States
- Products: vehicles Automotive parts

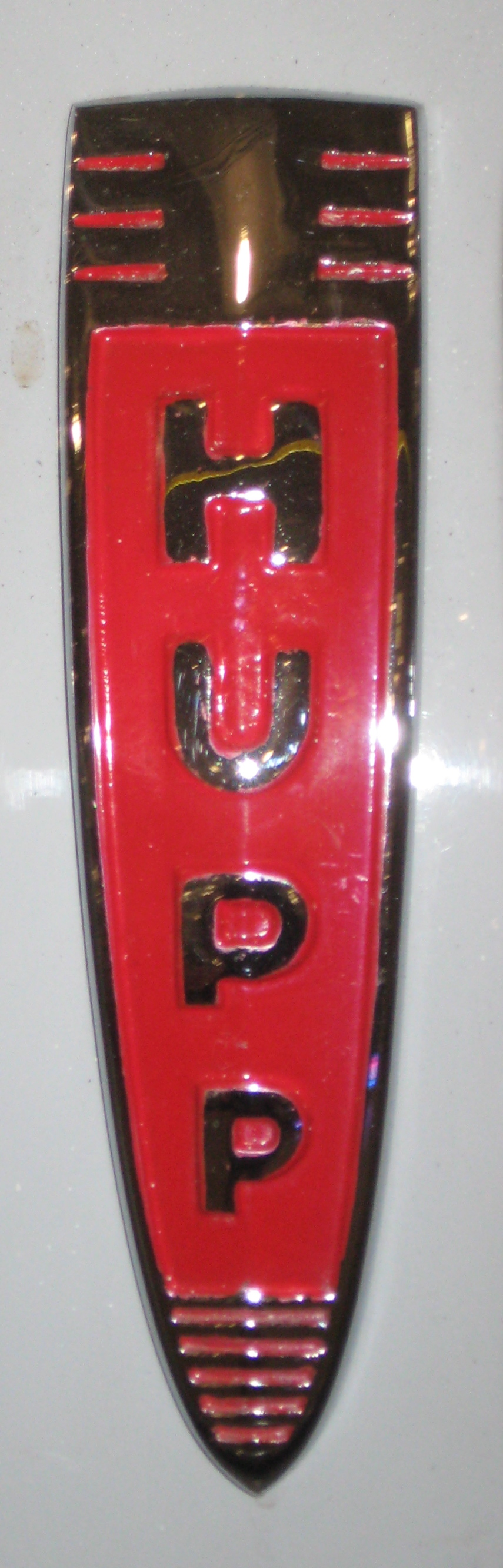
Hupp grille badge, on a 1941 Skylark

Hupmobile was a line of automobiles built from 1909 through 1939 by the Hupp Motor Car Company of Detroit. The prototype was developed in 1908.

== History ==
=== Founding ===
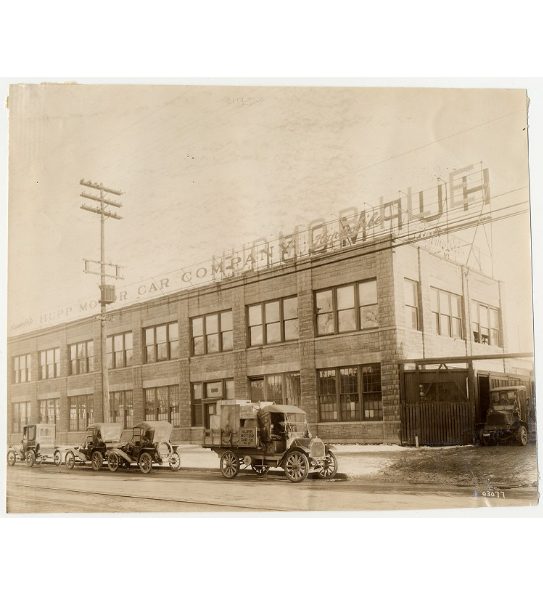
The Hupp Motor Car Company factory with a truck and three cars (1911)

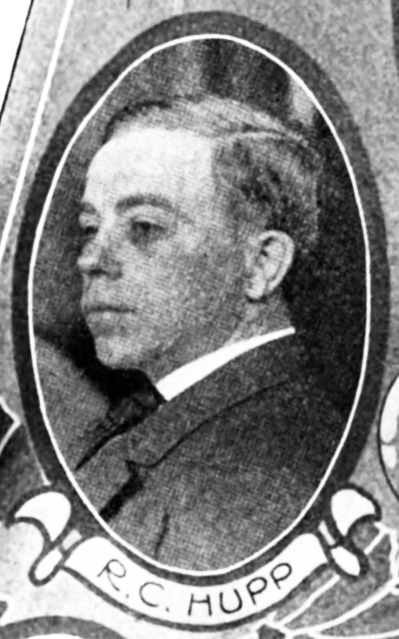
Robert Craig Hupp (1877–1931)

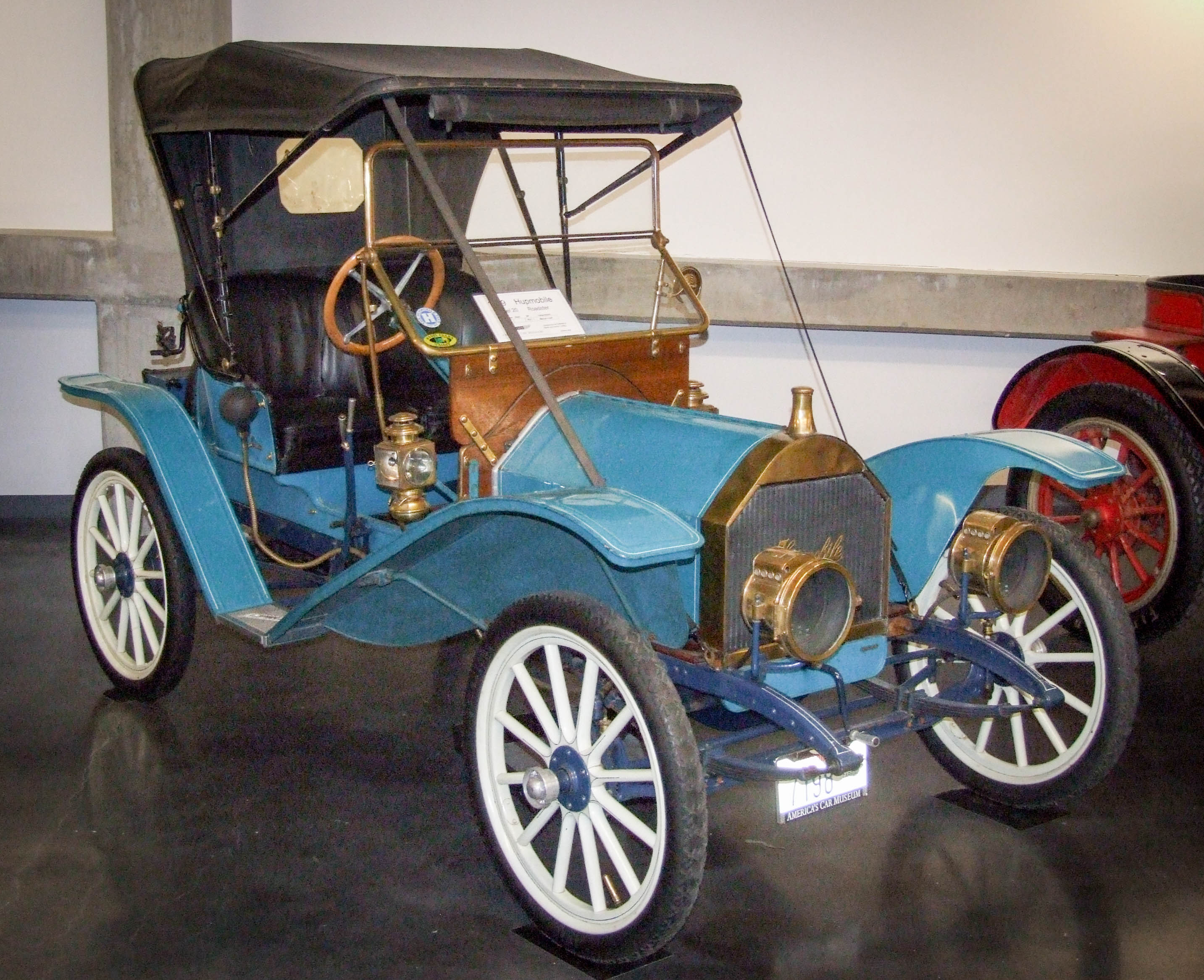
1909 Model 20 Runabout

Huppmobile Model E sedan

In 1909, Bobby Hupp co-founded Hupp Motor Car Company, with Charles Hastings, formerly of Oldsmobile, who put up the first US$8,500 toward manufacturing Hupp's car. They were joined by investors J. Walter Drake, Joseph Drake, John Baker, and Edwin Denby. Drake was elected president; Hupp was vice president and general manager. Emil Nelson, formerly of Oldsmobile and Packard, joined the company as chief engineer. Hastings was named assistant general manager. In late 1909 Bobby's brother, Louis Gorham Hupp left his job with the Michigan Central Railroad in Grand Rapids and joined the company.

==== Model 20 ====
Hupp Motors obtained $25,000 (equal to $895,833 today) in cash deposits at the 1909 automobile show (the lowest capitalization of Detroit's eight major car makers) to begin manufacturing the Hupp 20. The first cars were built in a small building at 345 (now 1161) Bellevue Avenue in Detroit, Michigan. The company immediately outgrew this space and began construction of a factory a few blocks away at E. Jefferson Avenue and Concord, next to the former Oldsmobile plant. The company produced 500 vehicles by the end of the 1909 model year (the fall of 1909). Production increased to more than 5,000 in the 1910 model year.

The Model 20's pricing was set at $900. The touring automobile was built on the same principles as the roadster. The Touring was nearly identical to the runabout aside from a longer wheelbase, a stronger frame, a stronger rear axle, and other critical pieces.

The four-cylinder engine had a bore of 3 1/4 inches and a stroke of 3 3/8 inches and was rated at 16 to 20 horsepower. The valves were on the engine's left side, with spark plugs over the inlets and relief cocks over the exhaust. The flywheel also served as a fan, and cars delivered to hot areas were equipped with an extra belt-driven fan. The engine was lubricated with a unique Hupp system containing enough oil for a 250 to 300-mile trip. The car had a 110-inch wheelbase and was fitted with 30 × 3 1/2-inch tires in front and 31 × 3 1/2-inch tires in the rear. This model never became popular partly because of the low power and only a two-speed transmission with very wide-spaced ratios. The low-speed ratio was 2.7 to one, and the high speed was direct. Reverse had the same ratio as the low, which meant that the car moved quite fast when it went backward. It had a distinct selling value in that the car was guaranteed to be free of material and workmanship problems. Furthermore, the manufacturer would replace any damaged material at no cost except for the tires.

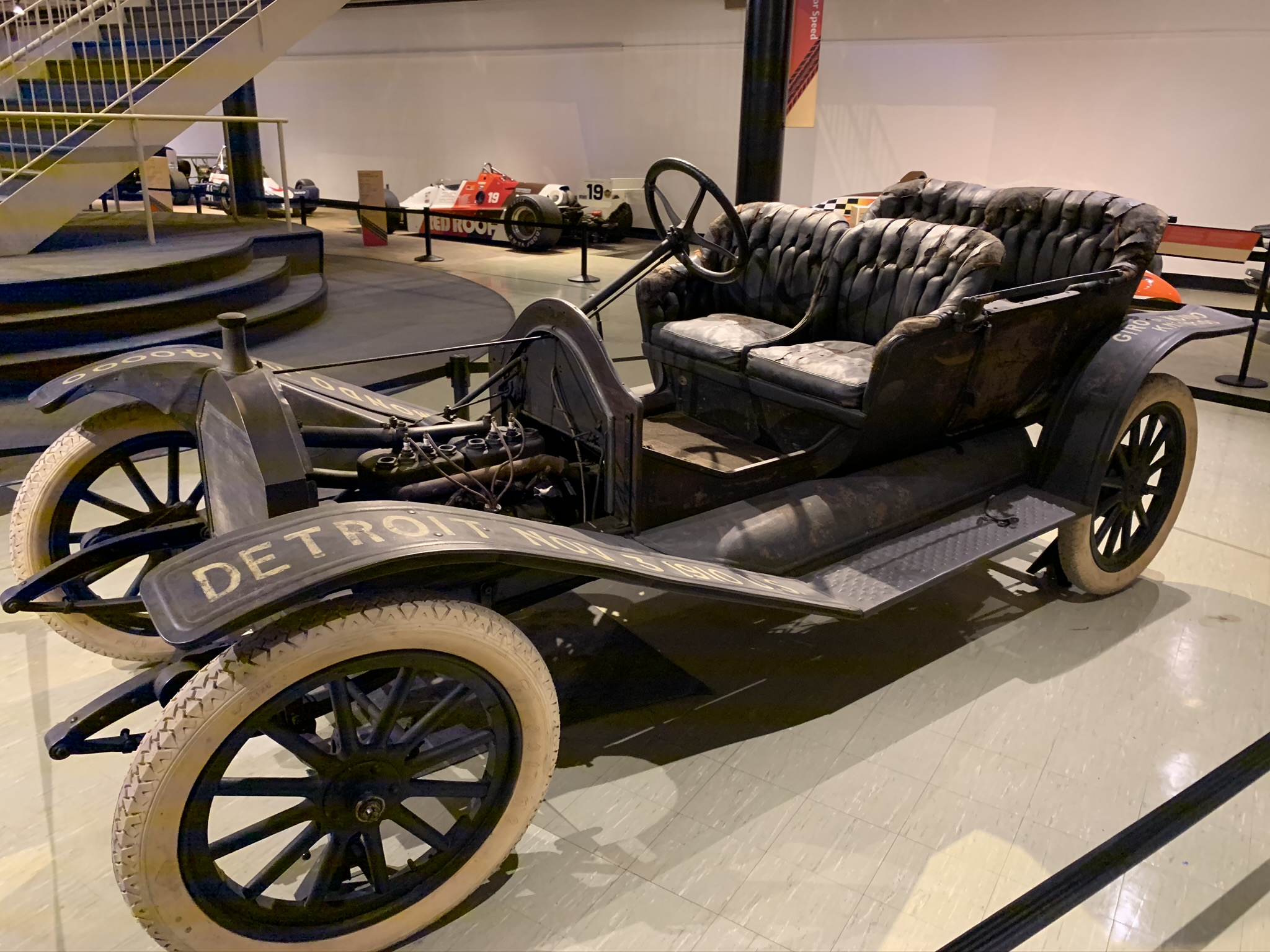
1911 Hupmobile at Crawford Auto-Aviation Museum

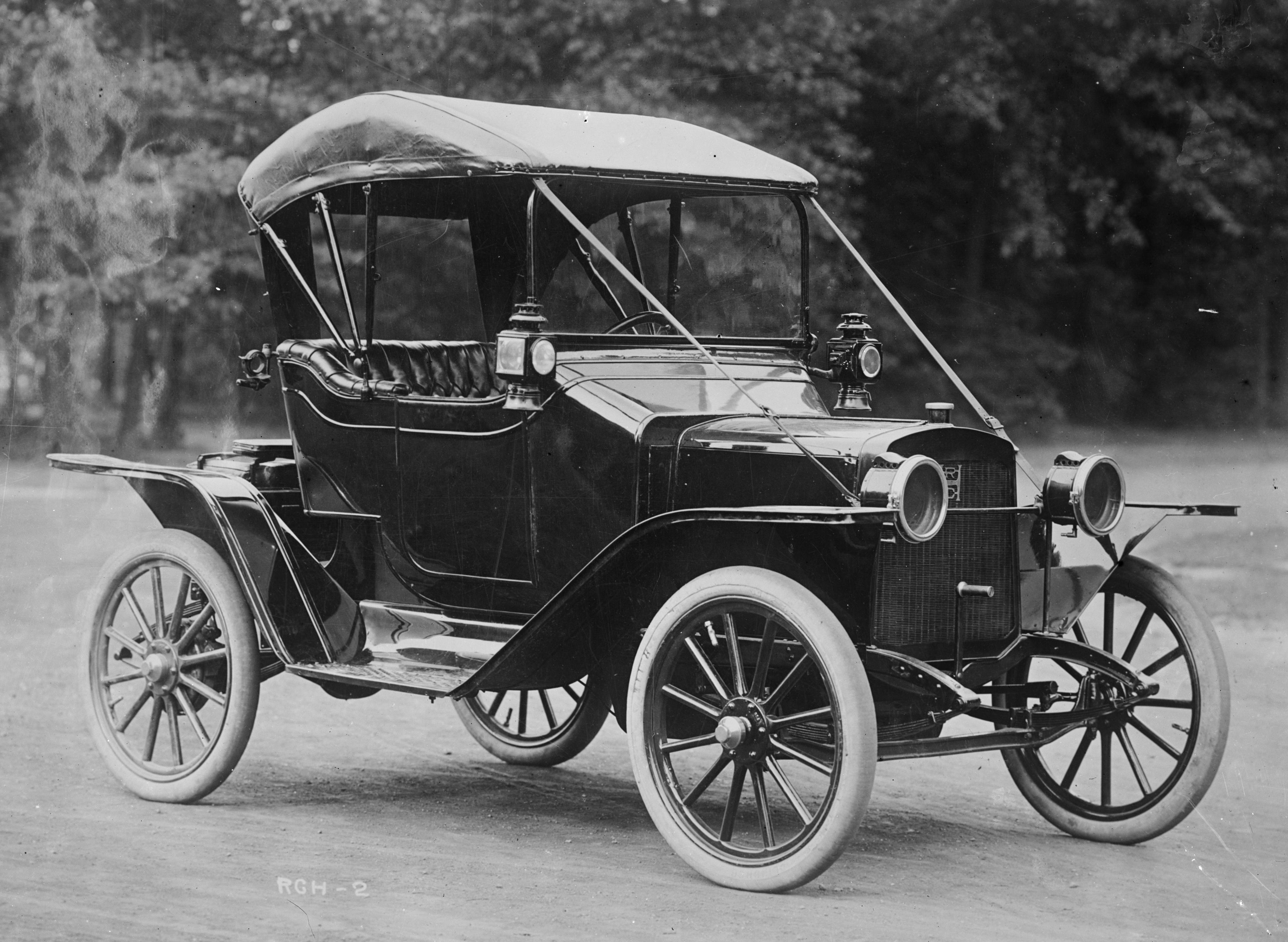
1912 RCH runabout

=== The "All-Steel" Hupp 32 ===
In 1911 Hupp became one of two automakers pioneering the use of all-steel bodies, joining BSA in the U.K.

Nelson approached Hale & Kilburn Company in Philadelphia looking for help with developing an all-metal body for the Hupp 32. Hale & Kilburn had pioneered the replacement of cast iron with pressed steel for many parts for the interiors of railway carriages. According to Nelson, "None of the Detroit plants would contract" to make an all-steel body for the Hupp 32. Edward Budd and Joseph Ledwinka were employed at Hale & Kilburn at the time, Budd as the general manager and Ledwinka as engineer. Budd was interested in the project. Hale & Kilburn had built some body panels for King and Paige but Budd had grander aspirations the Hupp project would permit him to pursue.

Budd and Ledwinka worked with Nelson to develop means to manufacture Nelson's design for this body. They devised a system where the body's numerous steel stampings were welded together by hand and supported by a crude system of angle iron supports that held the welded subassemblies together. The disassembled bodies were shipped by rail to Detroit where they were put back together, painted and trimmed in the Hupmobile factory. Both the touring car and a coupe were made by this process and even one Hupmobile limousine. In 1911 no one, not Nelson, Ledwinka or Budd, thought to patent the process to manufacture all-steel bodies.

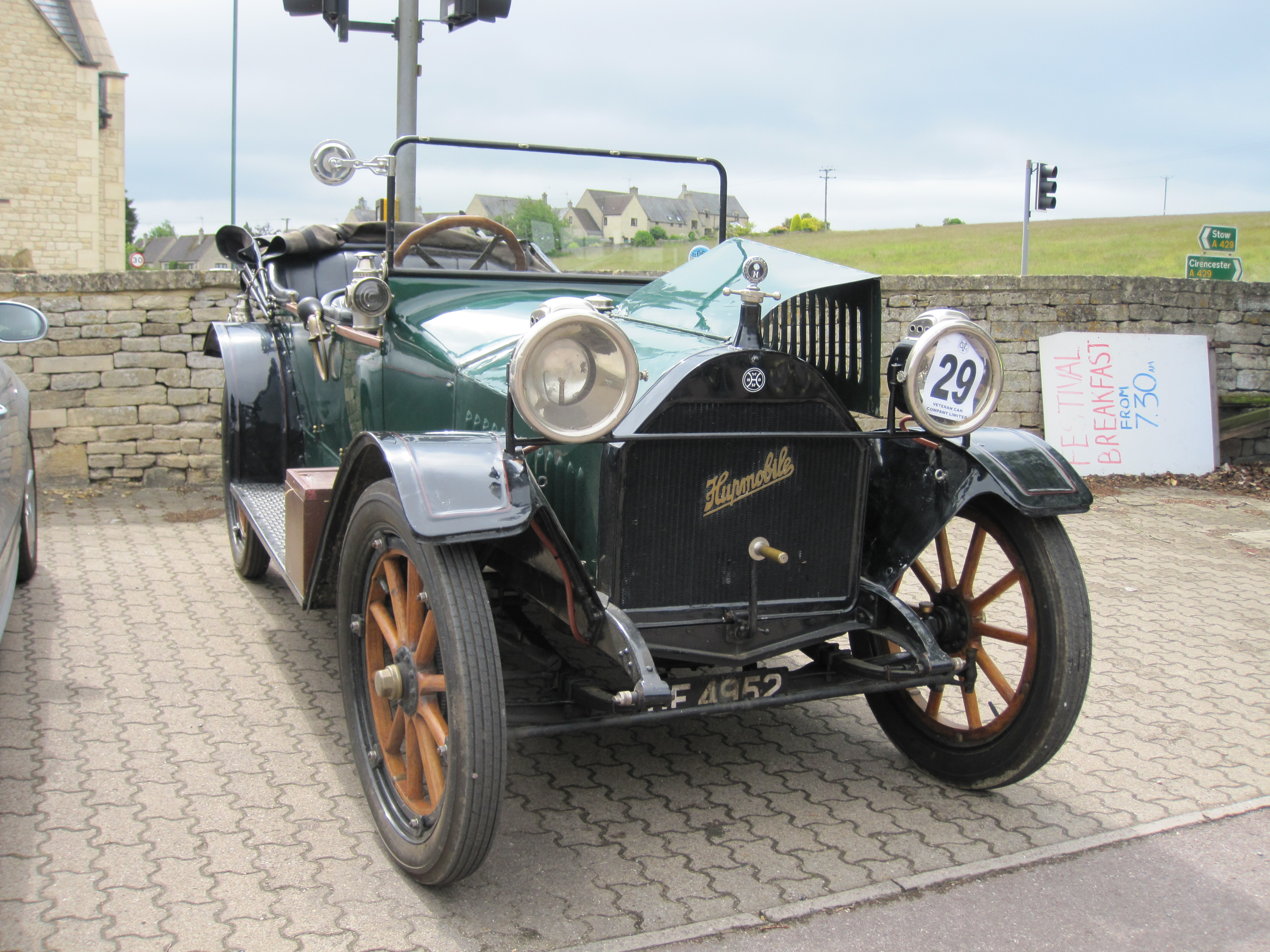
1913 Model 32 Touring Car

While the Hupp 32 bodies were in production, Budd and Ledwinka left and formed the Edward G. Budd Manufacturing Company. In 1914, Ledwinka filed for and received a patent for the process of making all-steel bodies. However, Budd later lost a patent infringement litigation it brought against C.R. Wilson Body Company when the court held that the Ledwinka patent was invalid. "[A]fter the art had developed...Ledwinka has endeavored to go back and cover by a patent that which had become public property.... [H]e is endeavoring to bring under his patent those things which belong to the public." The court relied on the production of the Hupp 32 in 1911 as a major example of the prior art. The opinion does provide insight as to what was or was not novel about the process to manufacture the Hupp 32's body.

When Hupp left Hupp Motors in 1913, he informed the company his supplier companies would devote their full capacity to make parts for RCH. Facing the loss of manufactured parts from Hupp Corporation and increasing demand for the Hupmobile, Hupp Motors acquired seven acres for a new factory at Mt. Elliott and Milwaukee. It moved into the new plant in late April 1912. (This factory was demolished as part of site clearance for General Motors' "Poletown" assembly plant in the early 1980s.) Hupp Motors sold the Jefferson Avenue plant to the King Motor Car Company.

Several thousand all-steel touring cars were made before Nelson resigned as chief engineer in 1912. Hupmobile's commitment to this leading-edge approach did not survive his departure. The rest of the Hupp 32 production used conventional body assembly processes.

=== Expansion ===
Carl Wickman, a car dealer in Hibbing, Minnesota, used an unsold 7-passenger model as the first vehicle for what became Greyhound. In 1913 Frank E. Watts was hired as a designer.

Hupp Motor Car Company continued to grow after its founder left. Hupp competed strongly against Ford and Chevrolet. DuBois Young became company president in 1924, advancing from vice-president of manufacturing. By 1928 sales had reached over 65,000 units. To increase production and handle sales growth, Hupp purchased the Chandler-Cleveland Motors Corporation (Chandler Motor Car) for its manufacturing facilities.

=== Decline ===
Sales and production began to fall even before the Depression in 1930. A strategy to make the Hupmobile a larger, more expensive car began with the 1925 introduction of an 8-cylinder model, followed by the elimination of the 4-cylinder Hupmobile after 1925. (Hupmobile made only 4-cylinder cars from 1909 to 1925.) While aiming for a more lucrative market segment, Hupp turned its back on its established clientele. This was the same mistake that many other medium-priced carmakers made at the same time. In an attempt to capture every possible sale, they offered many different models. With Hupmobile's low production volume, the result was that no model could be produced in sufficient quantity to achieve economy of scale.

=== Newer models ===
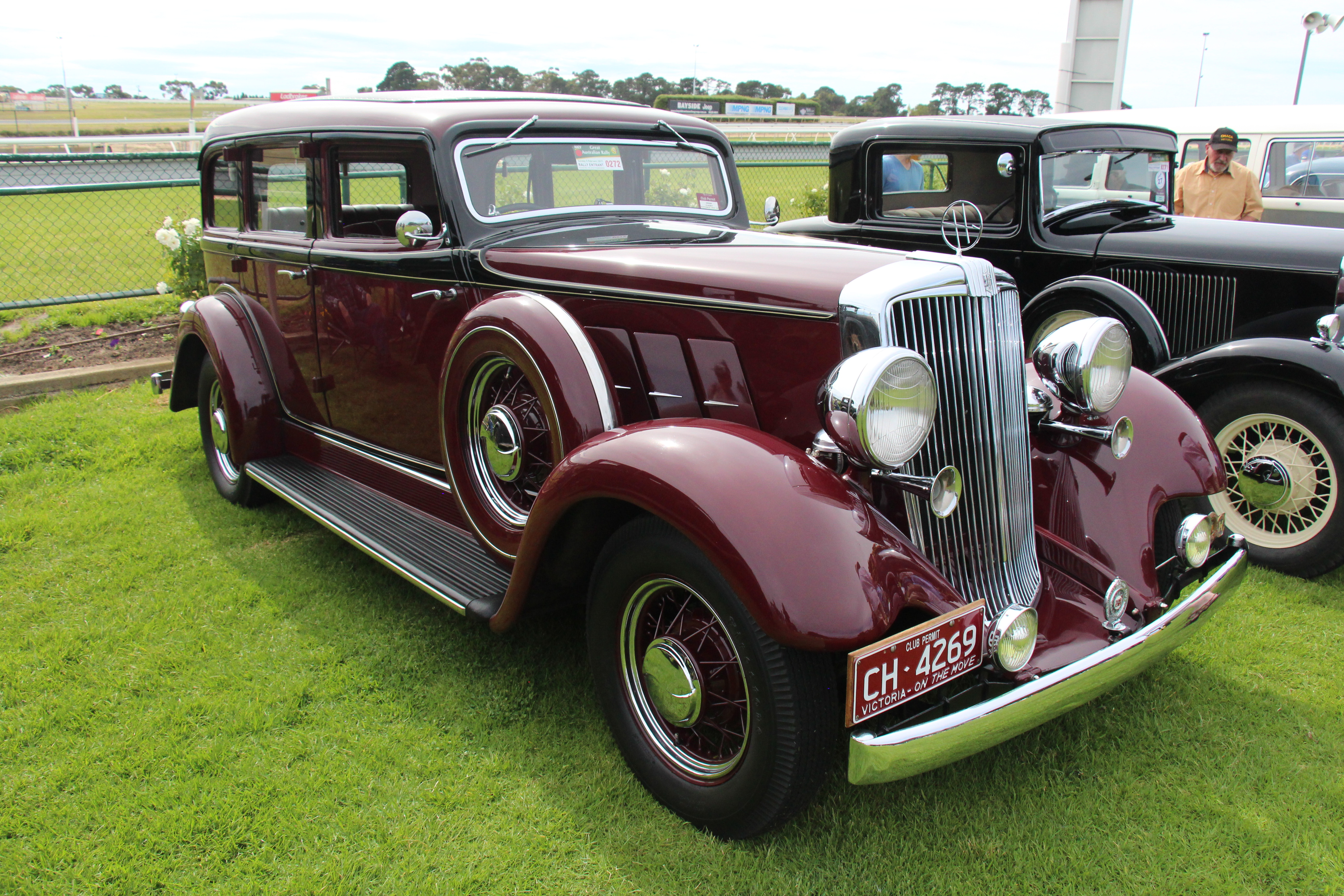
1933 Model K

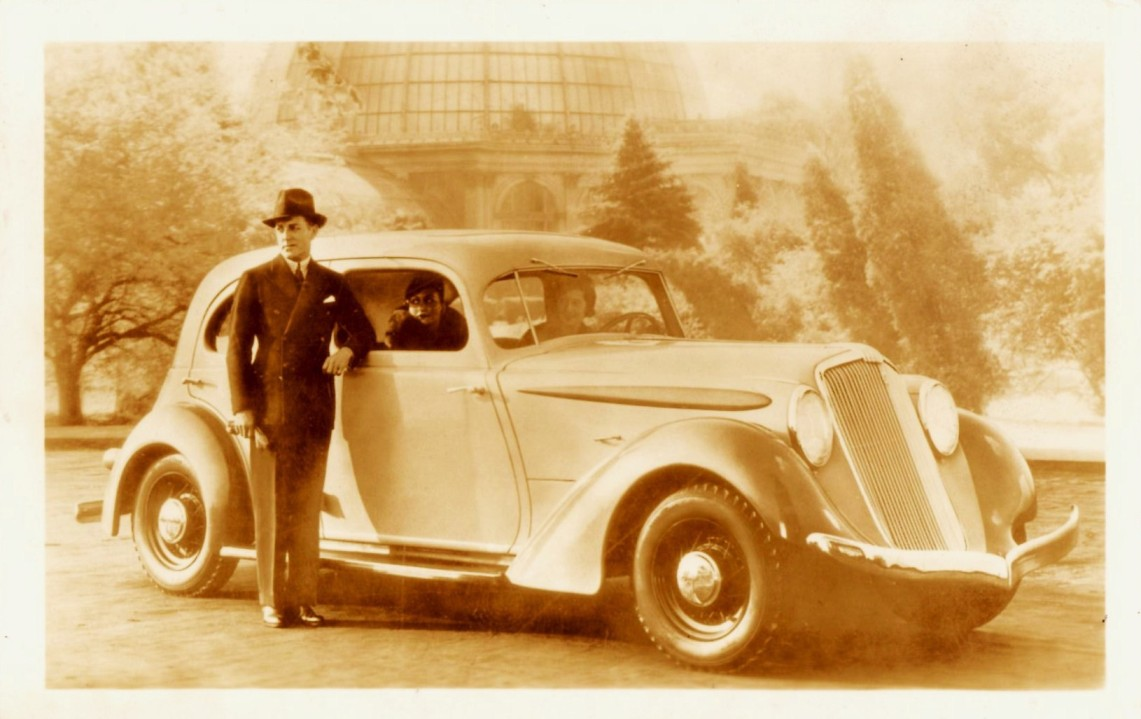
1934 Model J Aero-Dynamic by Raymond Loewy

Hupp abandoned its more conservatively styled product line and turned to Raymond Loewy to design its 1932 Hupp Model K, a flashy roadster that did well at the track, but sales continued to decline. Later, 1934 saw the introduction of a striking restyle called the "Aerodynamic" by Loewy, as well as the lower-priced series 417-W using J W Murray-built slightly modified Ford bodies.

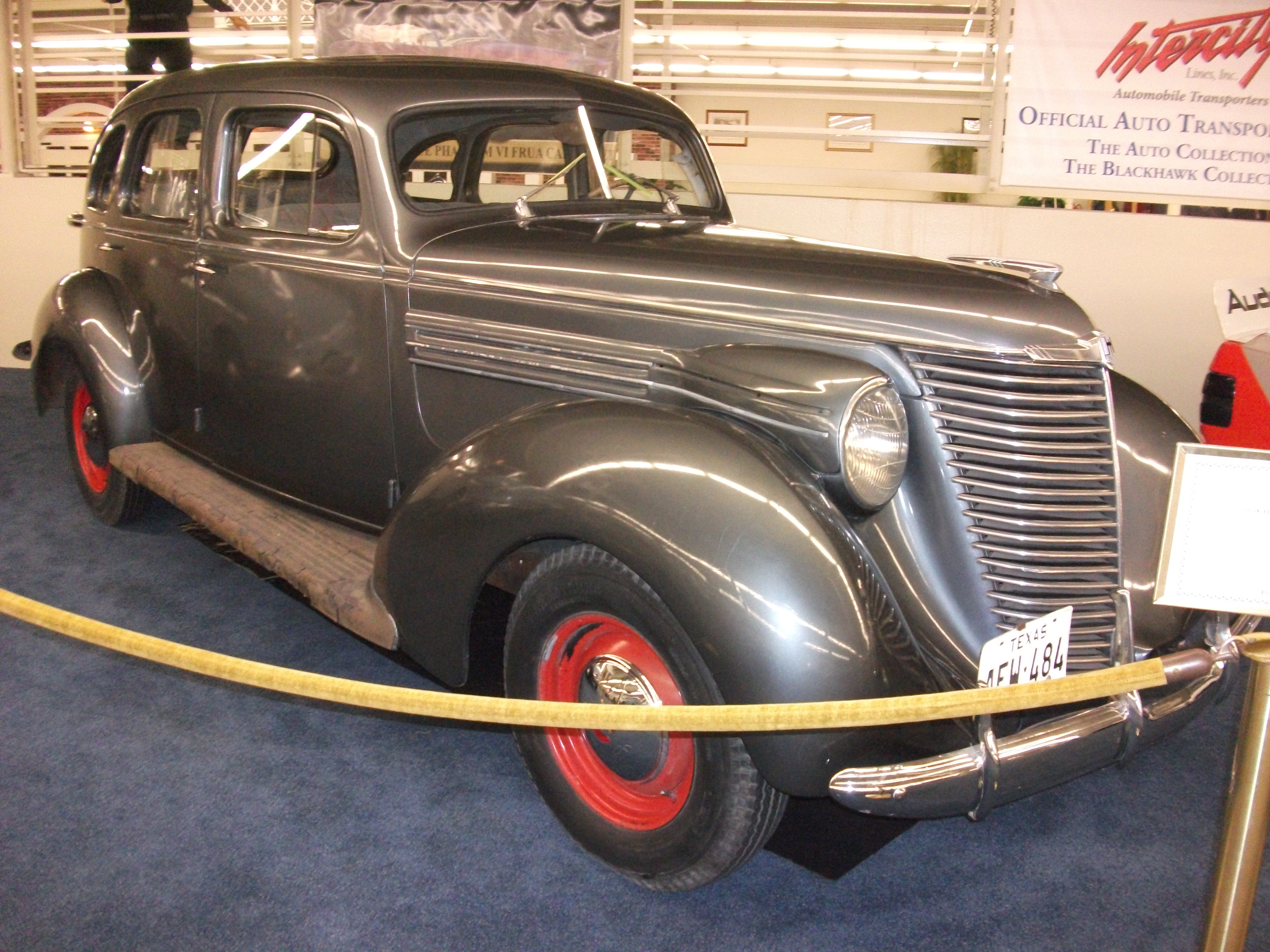
1938 Model E

Despite technical innovations, squabbles among stockholders and an attempted hostile takeover in 1935 took their toll on the company. By 1936 the company was forced to sell some of its plants and assets; and in 1937 Hupmobile suspended manufacturing.

A new line of six- and eight-cylinder cars was fielded for 1938, but by this time Hupp had very few dealers, and sales were disappointingly low.

Desperate for a return to market strength, on February 8, 1938, Hupmobile acquired the production dies of the Gordon Buehrig-designed Cord 810, paying US$900,000 for the tooling. Hupmobile hoped using the striking Cord design in a lower-priced conventional car, called the Skylark, would return the company to financial health. Enthusiastic orders came in by the thousands, but production delays soured customer support.

=== Joint venture ===
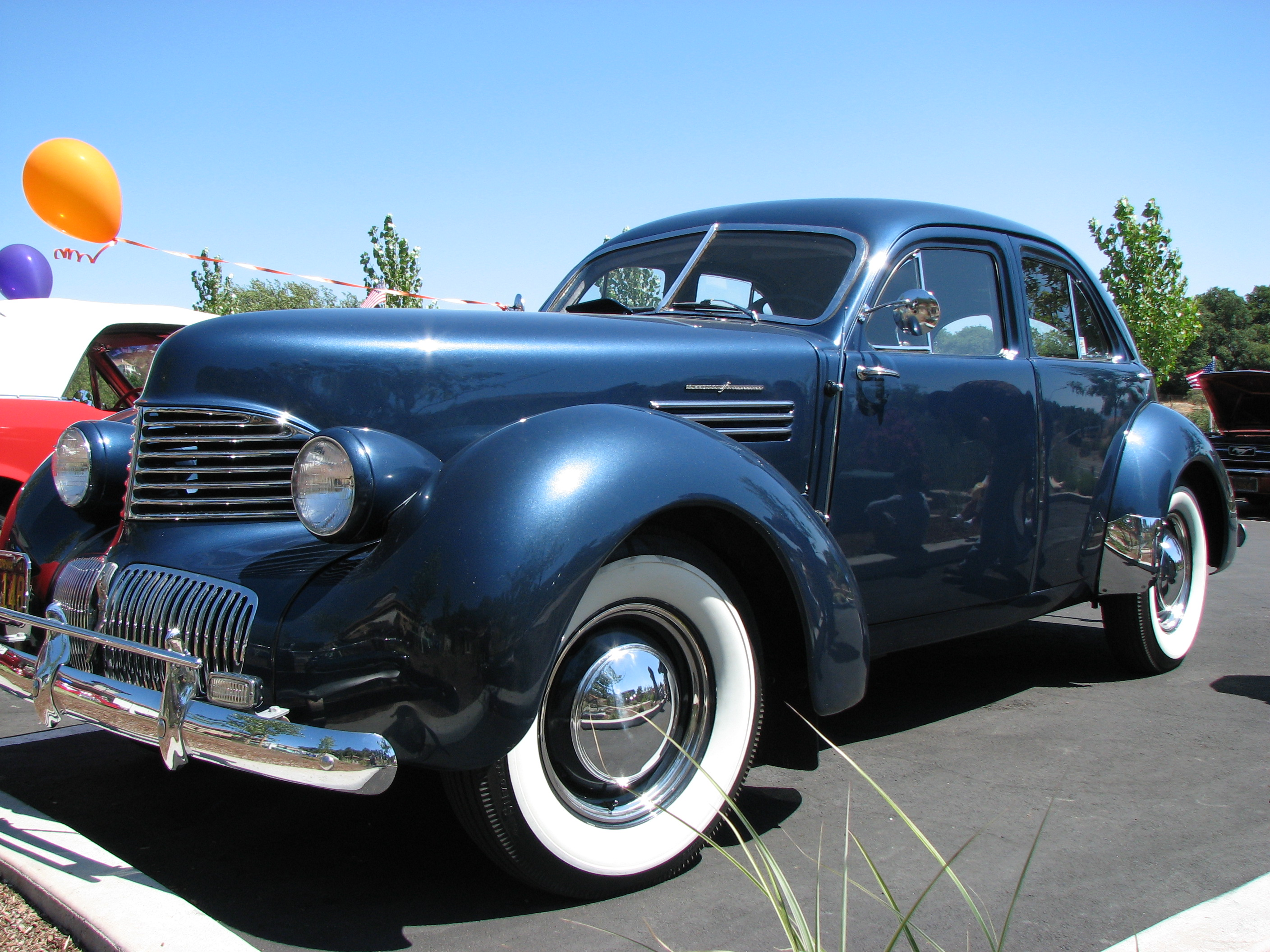
1941 Graham Hollywood

Lacking adequate production facilities, Hupmobile partnered with the ailing Graham-Paige Motor Co. to share the Cord dies. Hupmobile and Graham both sold similar models, all to be built at Graham-Paige's facilities. While each marque used its own power train, the Graham edition, called the Hollywood, differed from the Skylark in a few minor details.

=== Closure ===
In 1939, deliveries of the Hupmobile Skylark finally began. Unfortunately, it had taken too many years to produce and most of the orders had been canceled. Production lasted only a couple of months, and only 319 Skylarks were produced. Hupmobile ceased production in late summer. Graham-Paige suspended production shortly after the last Hupmobile rolled off the line.

== Technical innovations ==
In a constant effort to remain competitive, Hupp introduced a number of new features. They were one of the first U.S. automakers to equip their cars with "free wheeling", a device that enjoyed immense, but brief, popularity in automobiles in the 1930s. Hupmobile also pioneered fresh-air car heaters with the Evanair-Conditioner.

== Legacy ==
In 1914, Eric Wickman tried to establish a Hupmobile dealership but could not sell them so he started transporting miners in one of the vehicles and founded Greyhound Lines. The National Football League was created at Ralph Hay's Hupmobile dealership in Canton, Ohio, in 1920.

The Skylark's grille later inspired the grilles used on Lincoln Continental models in the 1940s. Their heater technology became widely adopted in the industry. Buick picked up the Skylark name for its own convertible and one-off coupe models in 1953; the nameplate was subsequently used on a midsize model from 1961 to 1973, then on a compact model from 1975 to 1998. The Hupmobile dealership in Omaha, Nebraska, is a prominent historic landmark. The dealership building in Washington, D.C., became the H Street Playhouse.

== Models ==
For specifications on various Hupmobile models:

- Hupmobile Model 20
- Hupmobile Model 32
- Hupmobile Model K
- Hupmobile Model R and Skylark ·
- Hupmobile RP
- Hupmobile RK
- Hupmobile RQ
- Hupmobile Model E
- Hupmobile Model A ·
- Hupmobile Model M
- Hupmobile Model M1
- Hupmobile Model E4
  - Overview of chassis numbers

== Overview of production figures ==
| Year | Production | |
|---|---|---|
| 1909 | 1618 | Model 20 |
| 1910 | 5340 | Model 20 |
| 1911 | 6079 | Model 20 |
| 1912 | 7640 | Model 20; Model 32 |
| 1913 | 12543 | Model 20; Model 32 |
| 1914 | 10318 | Model 32; Model K |
| 1915 | 10403 | Model 32; Model K; Model N |
| 1916 | 12055 | Model N; Model R |
| 1917 | 11293 | Model N; Model R |
| 1918 | 9544 | Model R |
| 1919 | 17442 | Model R |
| 1920 | 19225 | Model R |
| 1921 | 13626 | Model R |
| 1922 | 34168 | Model R |
| 1923 | 38279 | Model R |
| 1924 | 31004 | Model E; Model R |
| 1925 | 37287 | Model E; Model R |
| 1926 | 45626 | Model E |
| 1927 | 41161 | Model E |
| 1928 | 65862 | Model E |
| 1929 | 50579 | |
| 1930 | 22183 | |
| 1931 | 17451 | |
| 1932 | 10467 | |
| 1933 | 7316 | |
| 1934 | 9420 | |
| 1935 | 9346 | |
| 1936 | 74 | |
| 1937 | 875 | |
| 1938 | 1890 | |
| 1939 | 1231 | |
| 1940 | 319 | |
| Sum | 561.664 | |

== Gallery ==
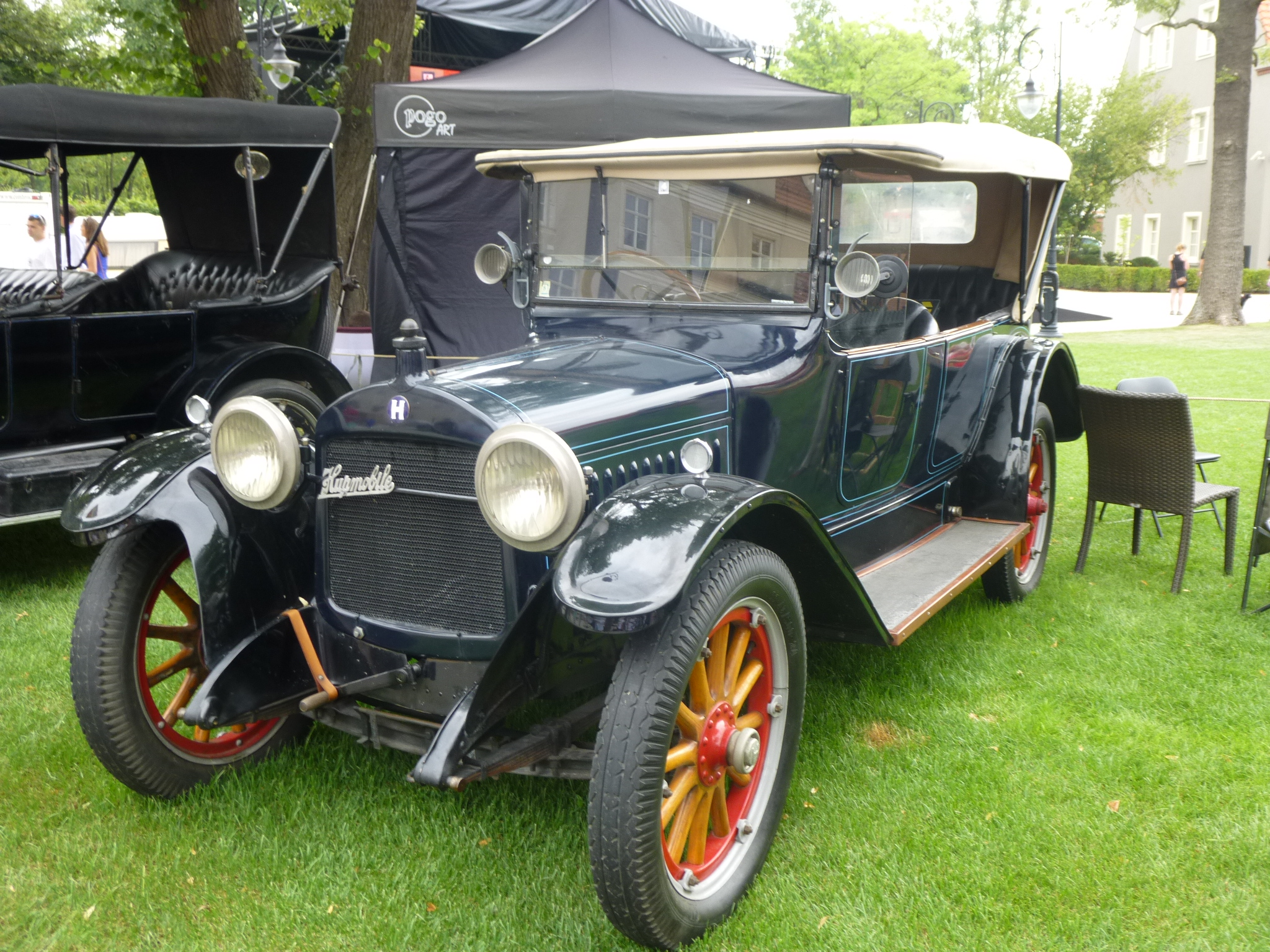
1915 Model N Touring Car – four cylinder

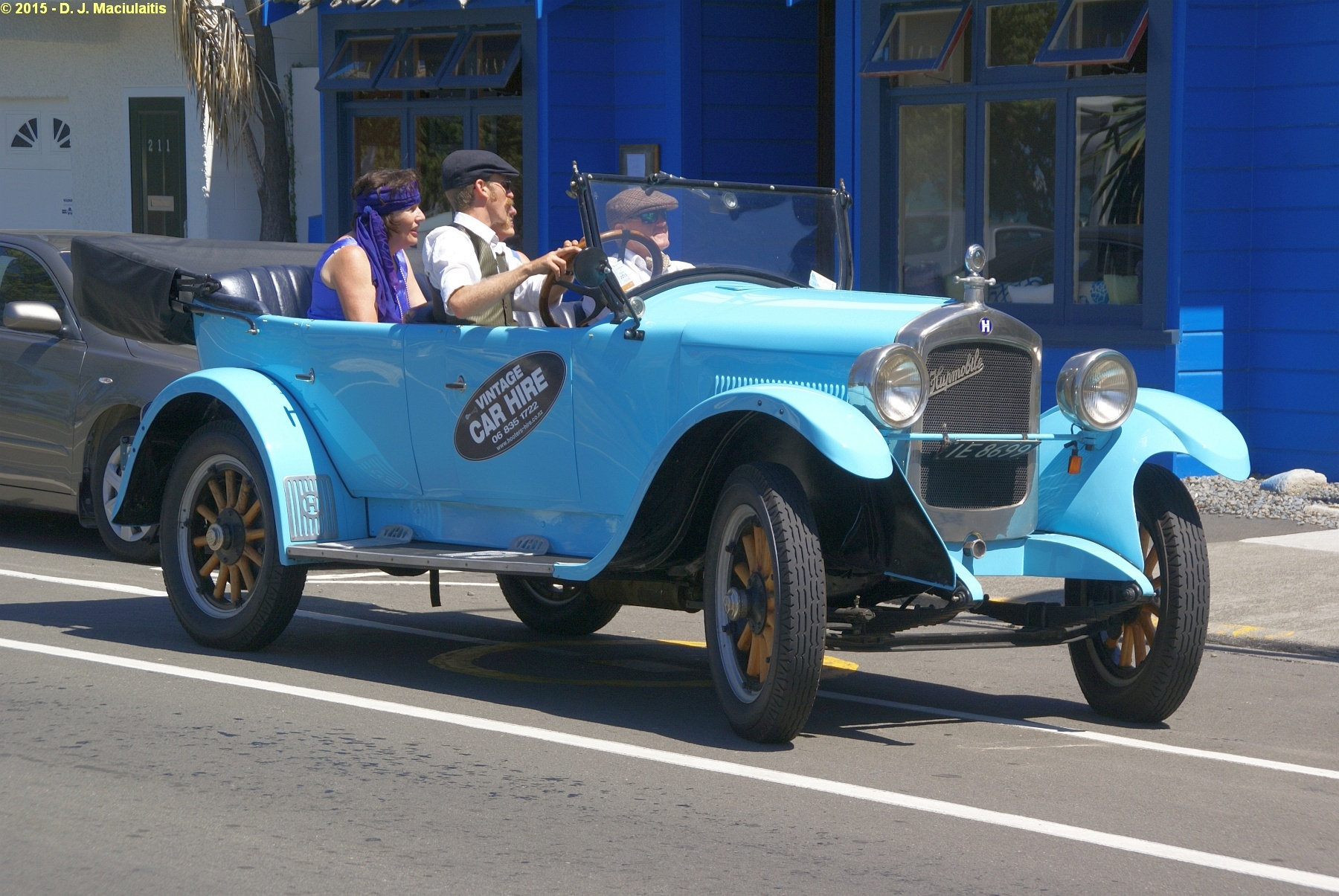
1925 Model R Touring Car – four cylinder

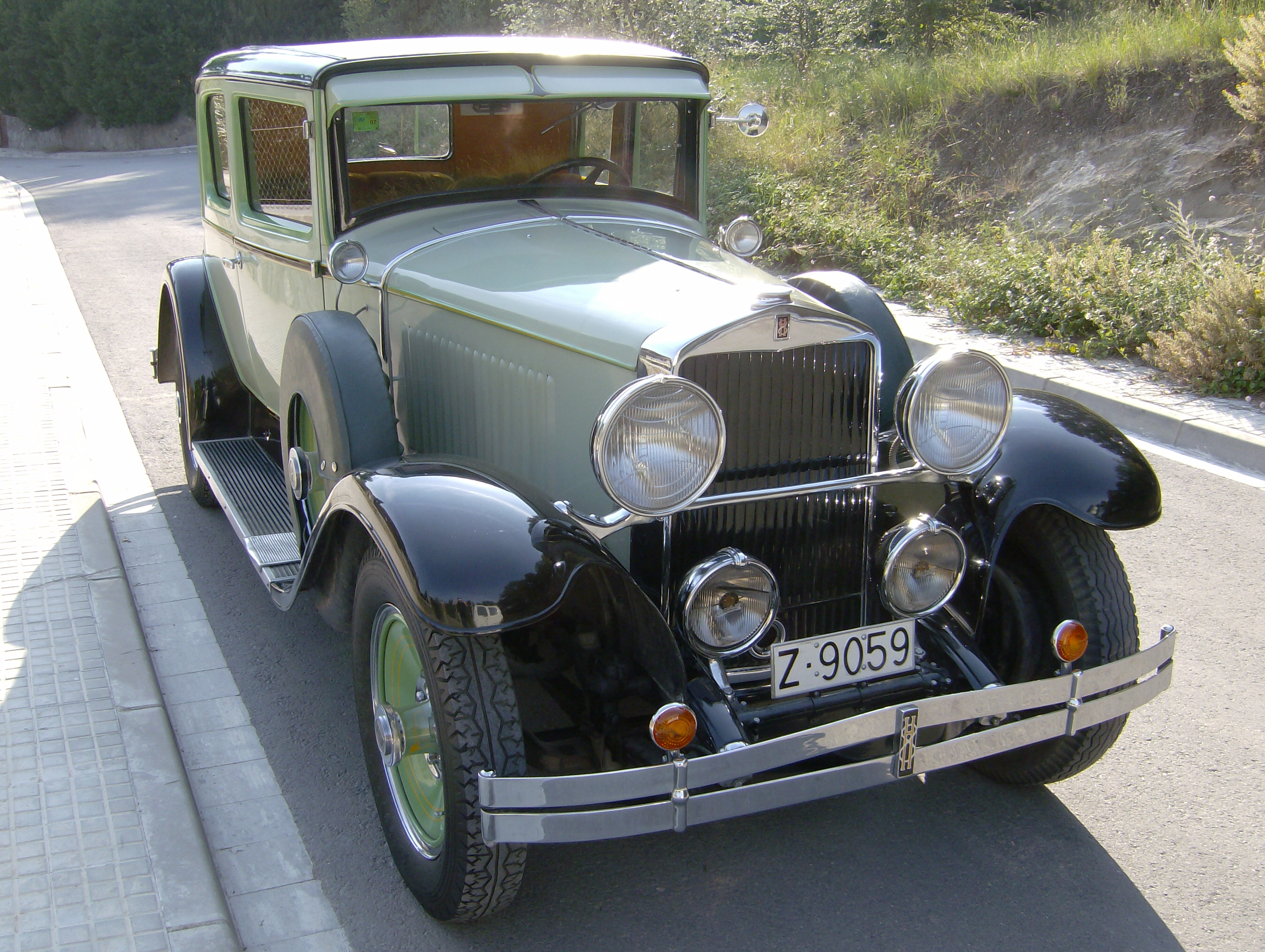
1929 Model M Opera Coupe – eight cylinder

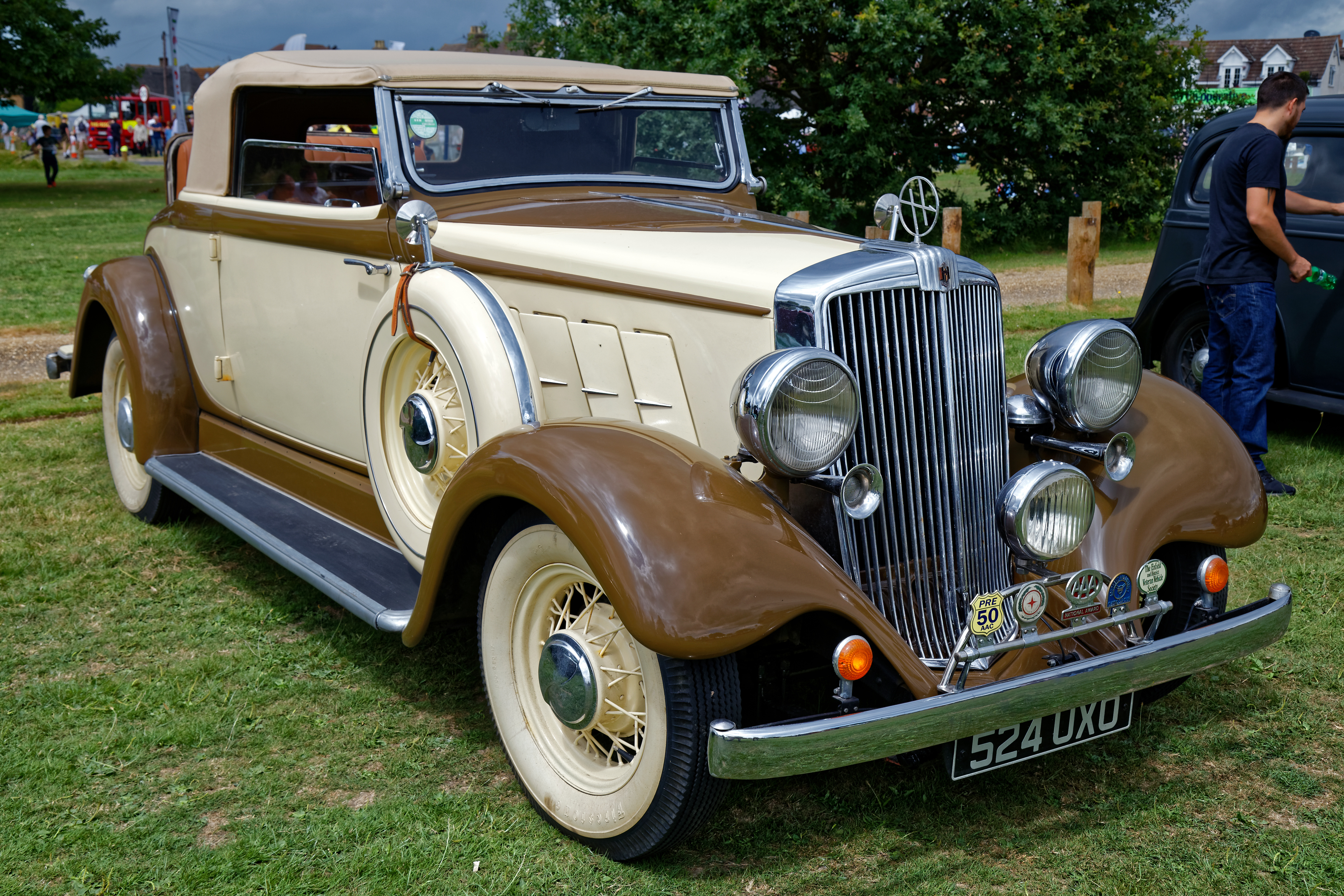
1933 Model KK Coupe – six cylinder

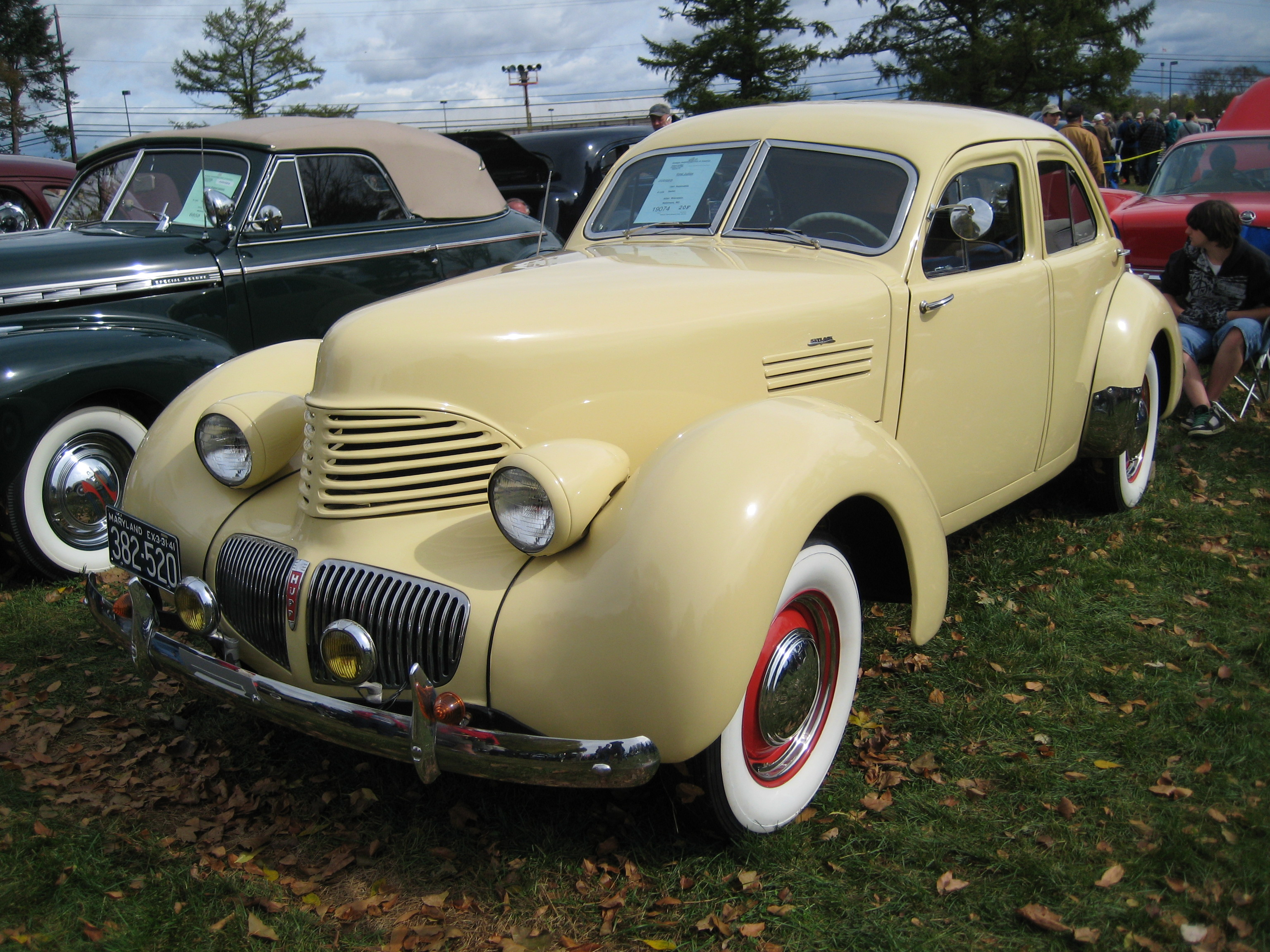
1941 Skylark – six cylinder
