= Nash Rambler straight-six engine =

Series of I6 engines built by Nash and American Motors

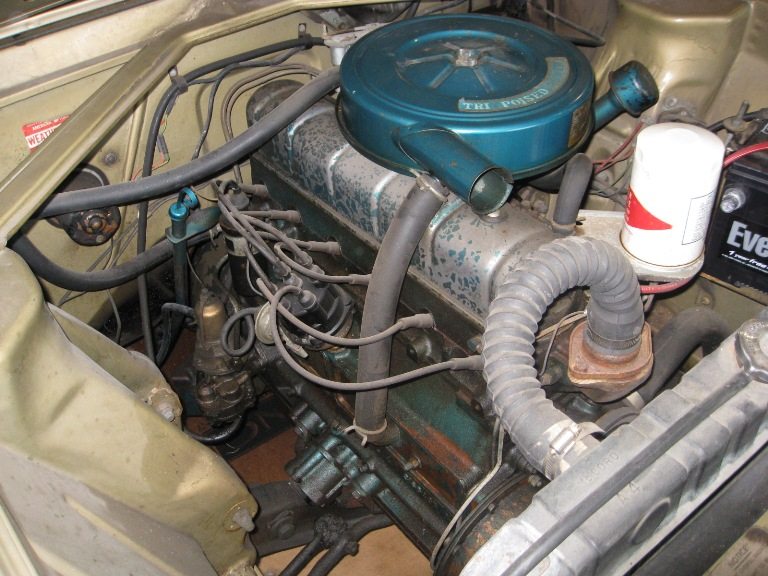
- The 195.6 OHV engine in a 1964 Rambler American

Overview
- Manufacturer: Nash Motors (1940-1954); American Motors Corporation (1954-1965)
- Production: 1940–1965

Layout
- Configuration: Naturally aspirated Straight-6
- Displacement: 172.6 cu in (2.8 L); 184.1 cu in (3.0 L); 195.6 cu in (3.2 L)
- Cylinder bore: 3.125 in (79.4 mm)
- Piston stroke: 3.75 in (95.3 mm); 4 in (101.6 mm); 4.25 in (108.0 mm)
- Cylinder block material: Cast-iron/Aluminum
- Cylinder head material: Cast-iron
- Valvetrain: L-head, 2 valves x cyl.; OHV, 2 valves x cyl.

Combustion
- Fuel system: Carburetor
- Fuel type: Gasoline
- Cooling system: Water-cooled

The Nash Rambler family of straight-six engines was developed and produced by Nash Motors. The design gained both small and significant engineering changes. Although initially named "Flying Scot", it became popularly known as the Nash Rambler engine because of its use in the compact line of Nash Rambler models. The design was subsequently upgraded and assembled by American Motors Corporation (AMC).

This engine was used in many Nash, Rambler, and AMC passenger cars from 1940 through 1965. The engine evolved in several displacements and was built with two different valvetrains. The engine was originally a flathead (L-head) design. An Overhead valve (OHV) version was introduced in 1956, although the flathead continued to be available. An aluminum-block version of the OHV design was introduced in 1961. Many engineering changes over the years were made, often without changing the part or casting number.

Nash merged with Hudson to form AMC in 1954. The AMC straight-6 succeeded this engine in 1964, a completely new design.

== 173 (Nash 600) ==
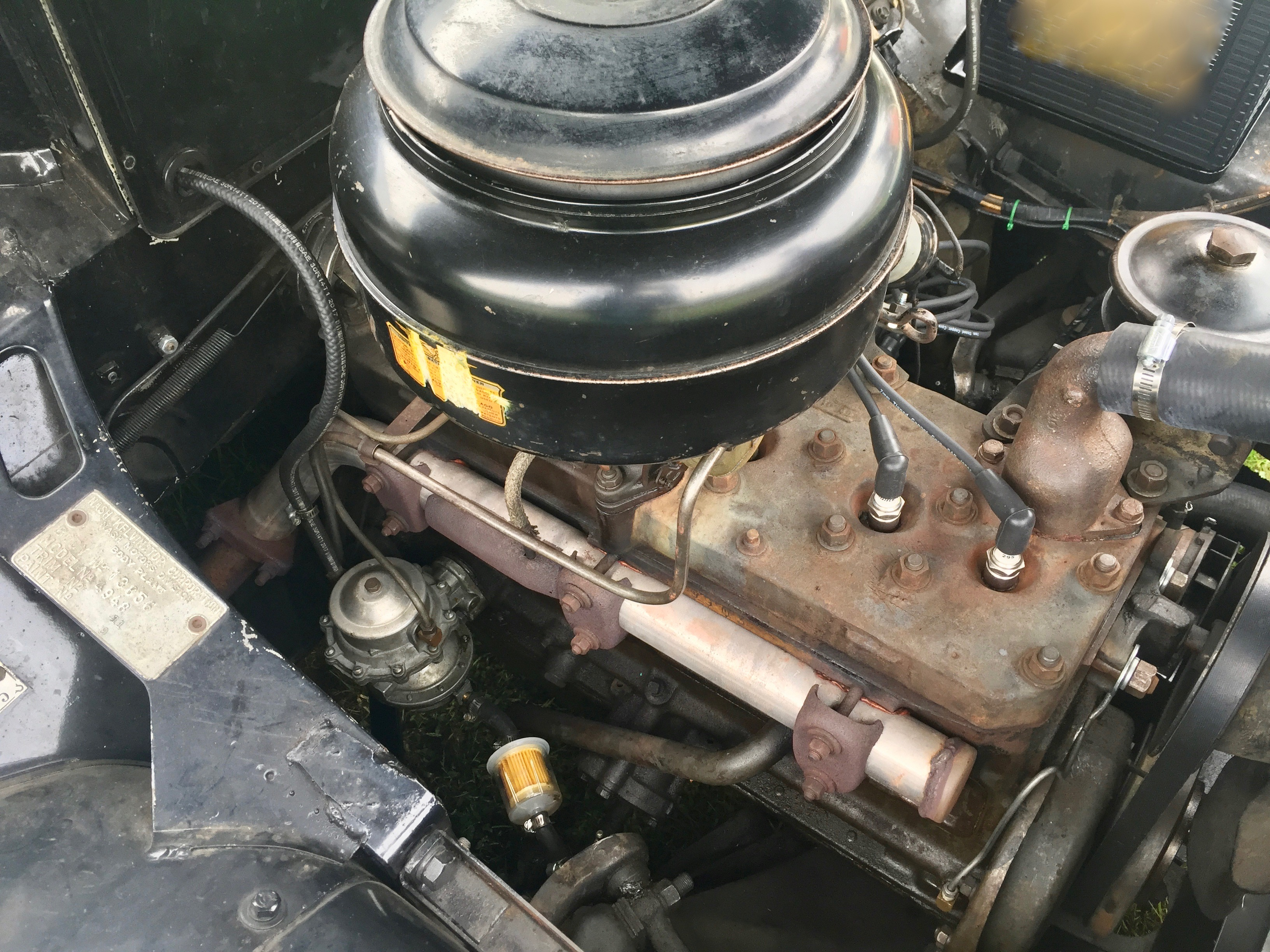
"173" L-head engine in a 1949 Nash 600

Nash Motors designed an I6 engine from a clean sheet in the mid to late 1930s, focused on fuel economy. The new engine was introduced in the autumn of 1940 in the 1941 Nash 600 series of cars. The new engine was dubbed the "Flying Scot" by Nash.

The initial design had a 3.125 inches (79 mm) bore and a 3.75 in (95 mm) stroke, for a displacement of 172.6 cu in (2.8 L). This bore was kept for all the variants of the engine, which were enlarged by increasing the stroke – an unusual practice given that changing forging is more expensive than changing the block casting. The cylinders are siamesed in pairs with no water jacket between cylinder pairs resulting in a narrow block deck surface. The intake and exhaust manifolds were integrated into the cylinder block casting to reduce both weight and cost; Nash drew attention to the increased reliability of the design by marketing it as "Monitor Sealed".

To help keep costs down, the 600 engine had four main bearings, unlike the 7-main-bearing 234 flathead engine it replaced. The new, smaller flathead design was initially rated at 75 hp (56 kW) at 3,600 rpm. The engine, combined with the new 600's advanced lightweight "unitized" body construction design, provided better than 25 mpg_{‑US} (9.4 L/100 km; 30 mpg_{‑imp}). Some buyers reported getting 30 mpg_{‑US} (7.8 L/100 km; 36 mpg_{‑imp}) or more.

After World War II ended, Nash updated the engine in the 600 models for the 1946 model year by increasing power to 80 hp (60 kW) at 3,800 rpm. Updates included larger intake valves, reworked manifold and valve passages, and a revised head which provided a higher compression ratio. A triple-venturi, down-draft carburetor replaced the earlier type, and several changes were incorporated to increase durability.

The 173 engine remained in use in the compact Nash Rambler models until 1952.

== 184 ==
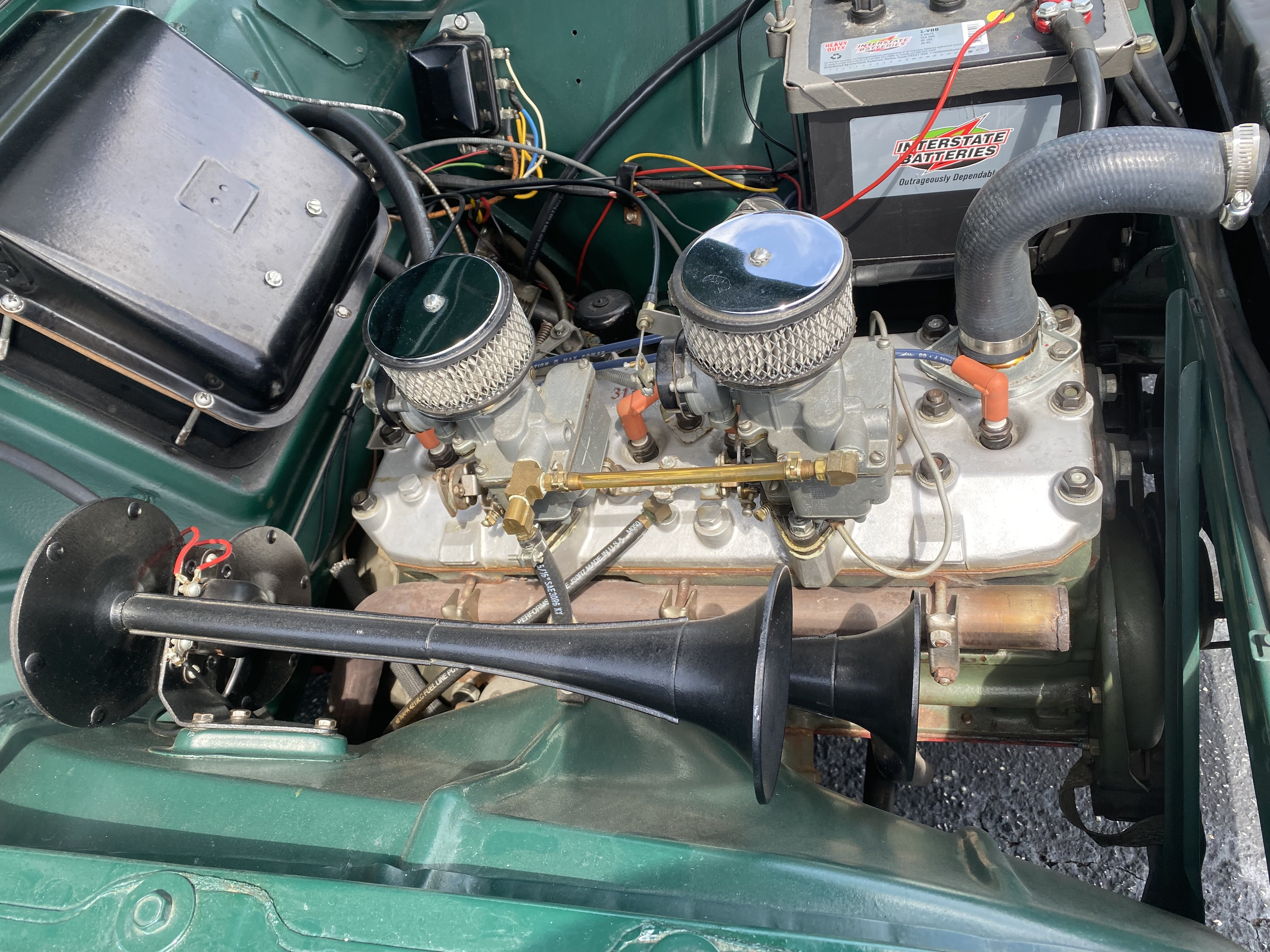
"184" L-head engine in a 1953 Nash Rambler

A new version of the Nash Rambler engine was introduced for the 1950 Statesman. It continued Nash's reputation for good gas mileage.

The stroke was increased to 4 in (102 mm), resulting in a displacement of 184 cu in (3.0 L) with power output rising to 85 hp (63 kW) at 3800 rpm. The engine ran on regular grade gasoline with a compression ratio of 7 to 1. and featured a "Uniflo-Jet" carburetor that was claimed to save fuel ordinarily wasted in fast acceleration.

The 184 version of the L-head engine was also installed in Nash Rambler compact cars until the end of the 1955 model year.

== 196 ==
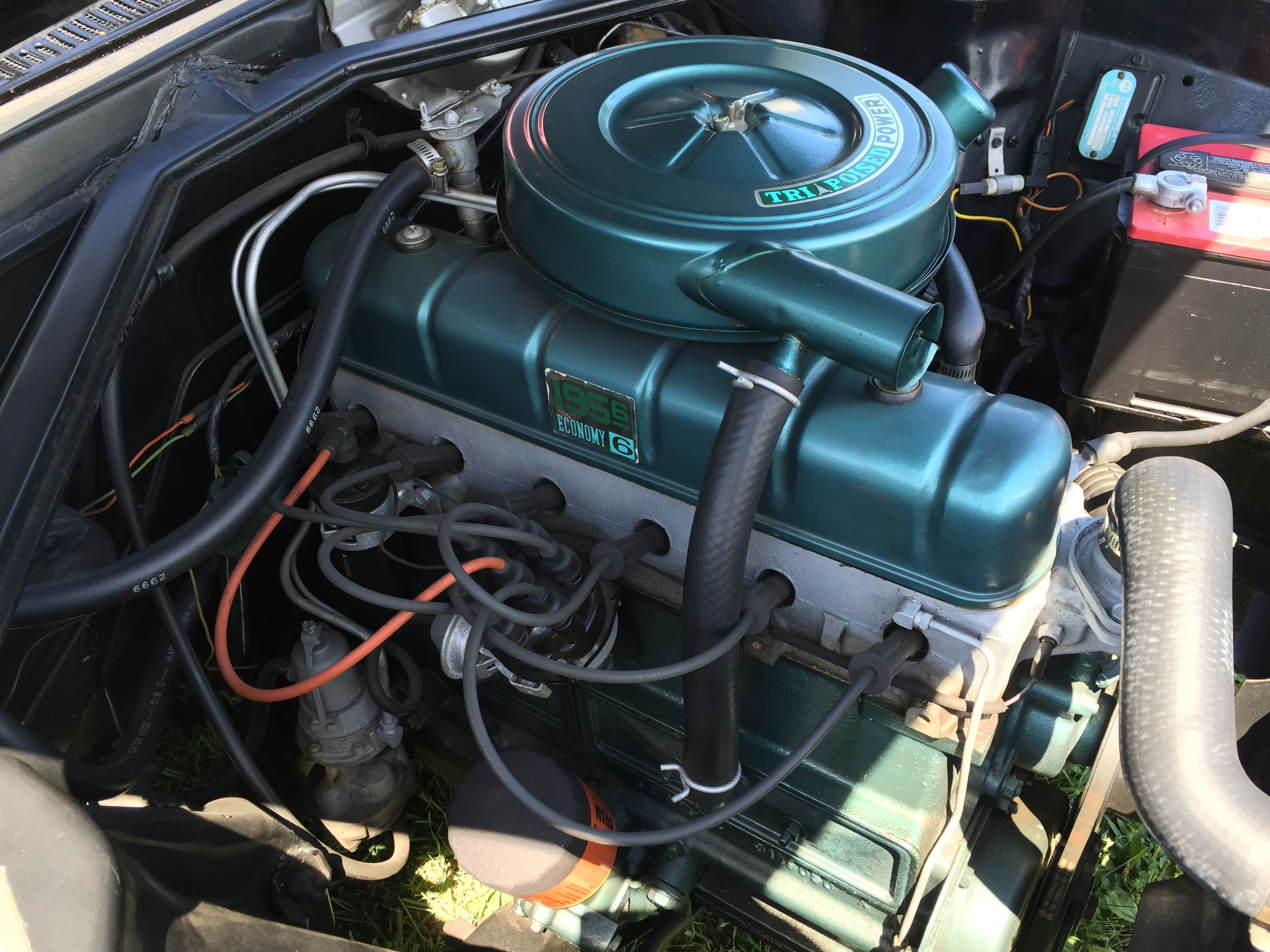
"195.6" OHV engine in a 1965 Rambler American

Although sometimes rounded to 196, Nash engine nomenclature included the decimal in the displacement, ostensibly as part of a marketing effort promoting "Nash Precision."

The 195.6 cu in (3.2 L) flathead (L-head) side-valve engine was introduced as the "Super Flying Scot" for the 1952 Statesman series, producing 88 hp (66 kW) with a compression ratio of 7 to 1. This engine was discontinued between 1956 and 1957. However, the 195.6 flathead version reemerged in 1958 as the economy engine for the "new" Rambler American and was built through 1965. The reintroduced 195.6 flathead version featured a new front-mounted water pump. Using high-quality parts such as forged crankshafts and connecting rods, these engines earned a reputation for durability. However, the flathead was prone to overheating under sustained heavy loads. The excessive heating was caused by the hot exhaust going through the cylinder block to the exhaust manifold. Furthermore, the cooling system is just adequate, and the location of the thermostat is problematic.

The 195.6 engine was redesigned into an overhead valve (OHV) version and introduced for the 1956 model year. This also became the new American Motors Corporation's first straight-six engine design. The new OHV configuration meant that some of the head bolts draw up from vertical walls, and some from horizontal webbing. The bolt pattern and the paired cylinder bores cause block deck issues and head sealing problems. The design through 1956 continued with the water pump mounted on the left side of the engine (driven by a shaft extending from the back of the generator). This was changed for 1957 with the water pump mounted on the front of the engine above the timing chain.

In 1961, American Motors introduced a die-cast aluminum block version of the OHV 195.6 cu in (3.2 L) engine. It was produced through 1964. This engine used cast-iron cylinder liners and a cast-iron head. The cylinder heads for the two types of block (aluminum and cast iron) have similar designs but are not interchangeable. The cylinder head for the aluminum block is roughly 1/8" wider than that for the cast-iron block and uses a slightly different head bolt pattern.

The oil pump design and system were changed in 1964. The new full-flow filtering replaced the bypass partial filtering, which was only adequate if recommended oil changes are followed. The 195.6 OHV requires more periodic maintenance than newer-model engines. The head bolts must be re-torqued (retightened) regularly. Factory service manuals recommend that head bolt torque be checked every 4,000 mi (6,400 km) and that they be re-torqued every 8,000 mi (12,875 km). Modern head gaskets can extend this service interval to re-torque the bolts every 12,000 mi (19,312 km), or every other year.

The cause of the head bolts loosening over time is believed to be thermal expansion and contraction of the head due to the rather heavy design. The head expands and contracts by as much as 0.02 in (0.51 mm) in height during normal operation. As temperatures change, the head loosens the bolts over time. Eventually, this causes the seal between the head and block to fail. Regular re-torquing maintenance is also imperative to prevent the engine from overheating (the first sign of a blown head gasket) and warping or cracking the head. The cast-iron liners in the aluminum-block version can also shift if the head bolts are not properly torqued and the engine overheats. Moreover, good replacement heads and aluminum blocks for these engines are increasingly difficult to find.

== See also ==
- List of AMC engines
