= Nash 600 =

Line of cars produced by Nash Motors Corporation

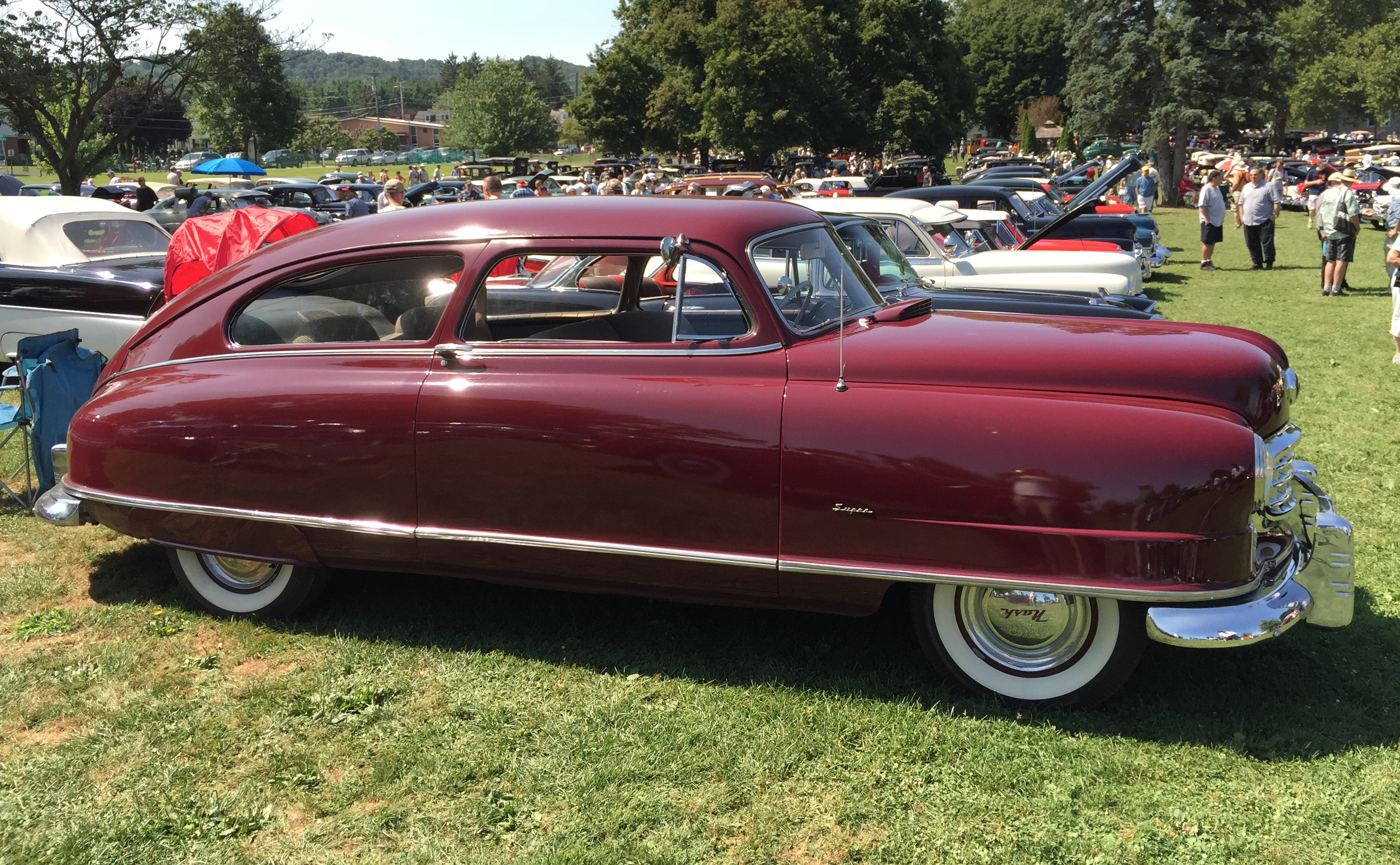
- 1949 Nash 600 Super two-door Airflyte

Overview
- Production: 1940–1942 and 1945–1949
- Model years: 1941–1942 and 1946–1949
- Assembly: United States; Australia

Body and chassis
- Body style: 2-door coupe; 2-door sedan; 4-door sedan; 4-door fastback sedan

Powertrain
- Engine: 172.6 cu in (2.8 L) Nash 600 L-head I6
- Transmission: 3-speed manual; 3-speed manual with overdrive

Dimensions
- Wheelbase: 112 in (2,845 mm)
- Length: 195 in (4,953 mm) 1941; 201 in (5,105 mm) 1949
- Width: 77.5 in (1,968 mm)
- Height: 63 in (1,600 mm)

Chronology
- Predecessor: Nash LaFayette
- Successor: Nash Statesman

The Nash 600 is an automobile manufactured by the Nash-Kelvinator Corporation of Kenosha, Wisconsin, from 1941 through 1949 model years. It was the replacement for Nash's LaFayette models. The 600 was positioned in the low-priced market segment. The line was renamed for the 1950 model year as Nash Statesman.

The Nash 600 was the first mass-produced unibody-constructed car in the United States. The "600" name comes from the car's advertised ability to go 600 miles (966 km) on one tank of gasoline.

== Innovations ==
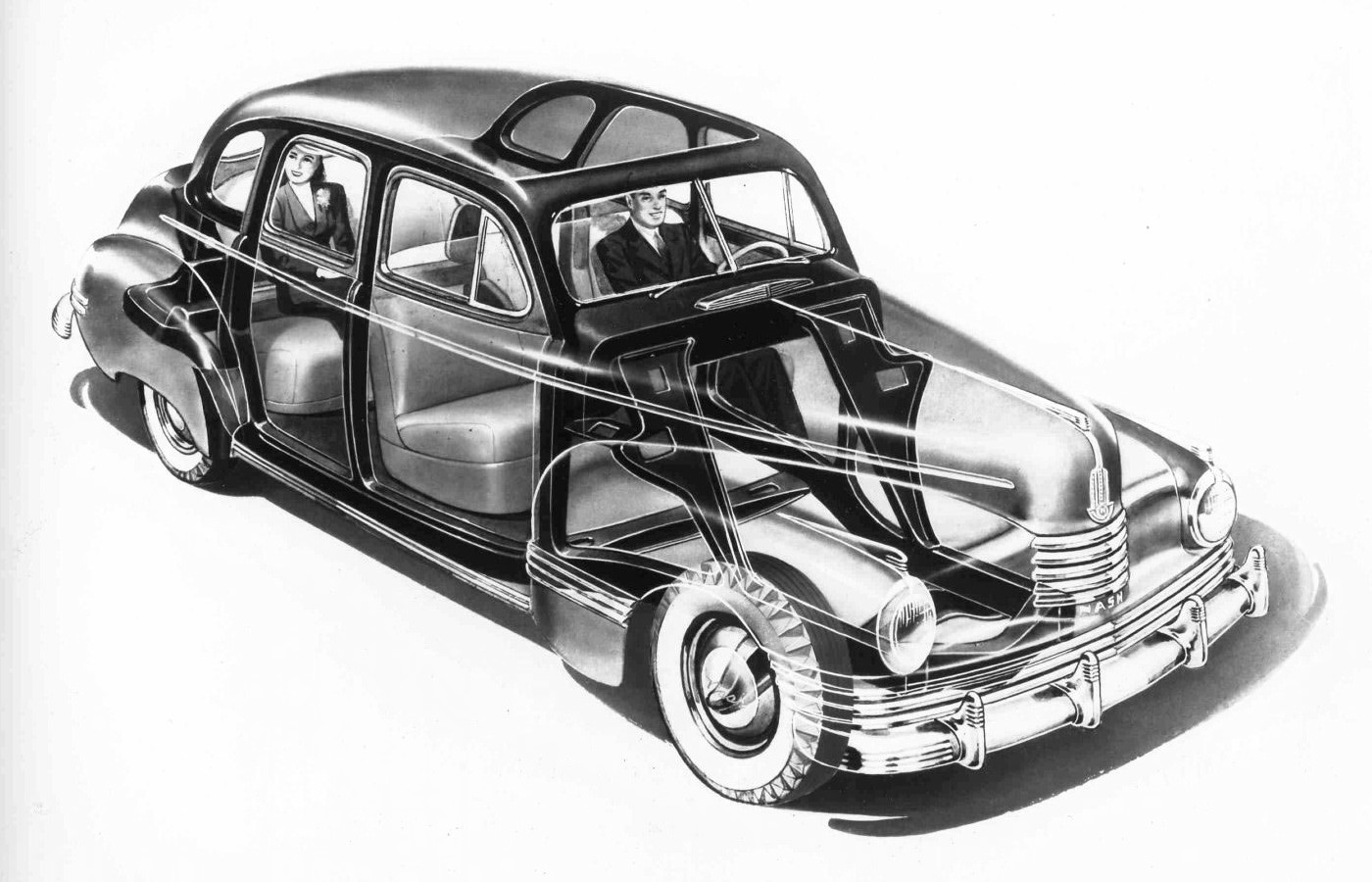
News release drawing of the 1942 Nash 600 showing its unibody construction

Under the leadership of George W. Mason, president of the newly merged Nash-Kelvinator Corporation, a strategic objective was to redefine Nash's image in the automotive marketplace. The Nash 600, introduced for the 1941 model year was the inaugural design. Nash relied on Theodore (Ted) Ulrich, who worked at the Budd Company, for the innovations in automobile body manufacturing. Ulrich had previously worked with Nash's chief of engineering, Nils Erik Wahlberg, in the development of the all-new, radically styled 1949 Airflyte models.

The "600" designation was a marketing strategy reinforcing the car's ability to travel 600 miles (966 km) on a full tank of gasoline. This was accomplished because of the car's fuel efficiency, which ranged from 25 to 30 mpg_{‑US} (9.4 to 7.8 L/100 km; 30 to 36 mpg_{‑imp}), and its 20-US-gallon (76 L; 17 imp gal) fuel tank.

The Nash 600 incorporated groundbreaking innovations. The most significant was its unibody (unitized body/frame) construction technique, making it the first mass-produced automobile in the United States with this structure. Unlike the traditional body-on-frame method, where a car body is bolted onto a separate chassis frame, the Nash 600 featured a design where the car body and frame were welded together as a single, integral unit. As a result, the car's weight was reduced by approximately 500 lb (227 kg) compared to conventionally built models. The single, welded unit was a more rigid structure, contributing to improved handling. Additionally, the unibody avoided the rattles and squeaks commonly associated with separate body and frame designs. The suspension system was independent in the front with front and rear coil springs. The competition in its market segment continued to use rudimentary leaf springs in the rear. The interiors were spacious and well-appointed for its market segment. The Nash's advantages were highlighted in marketing efforts.

Nash invested $7.5 million for the design and tooling, a substantial amount for the small independent automaker. Furthermore, the unibody required the development of new techniques for collision repairs, including a new portable body and frame puller tool that quickly gained international acceptance.

== 1941 ==
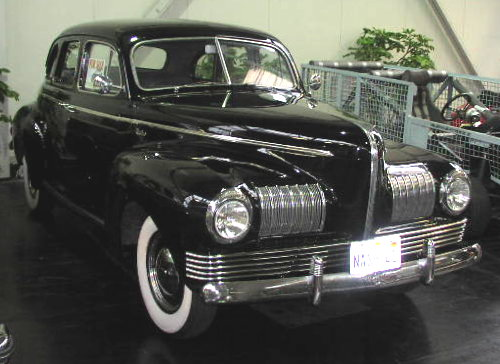
1941 Nash sedan

Launched for the 1941 model year, the Nash 600 was a breakthrough for the automaker and described by Time magazine as the only completely new car for 1941. Initially, the cars were branded as the "Ambassador 600". They were positioned in the new "lower-price category". Two versions of four-door sedans were offered: a "Slipstream" (fastback) with a smooth, flowing roofline that integrated into the rear, with no protruding lights, running boards, or exposed door hinges, and a "Sedan" with a built-in trunk (notchback) featuring a more conventional rear design. Two-door versions were a "Coupe Brougham" that included a full-width front and rear seating for six adults and a "Business Coupe" with only a bench seat in the front and a large, lined cargo compartment in the rear of the cabin. A popular feature of the 600 sedan models was its ability to convert into a sleeping car. In a few minutes, the rear seat folded forward, an attached mattress unfolded, and a mattress pad could be placed over the trunk platform, allowing the addition of sheets and blankets for a comfortable bed.

The engine was already proven for its efficiency, a 172.6 cu in (2.8 L) L-head I6 producing 75 hp (56 kW) at 3,600 rpm. A three-speed manual gearbox had an electric-controlled overdrive unit. Coil springs on all four wheels contributed to the ride, while a 33-foot (10.1 m) turning circle enhanced maneuverability. Nash included its "Sand-Mortex" sound proofing and "Fabreeka" insulation to the passenger cabin.

The Nash 600's fuel economy was demonstrated during a 1941 event jointly sponsored by the American Automobile Association (AAA) and the Gilmore Oil Company. Similar to the Mobilgas Economy Runs, the new car delivered 25.81 mpg_{‑US} (9.1 L/100 km; 31.0 mpg_{‑imp}) on regular roads, making it the "Best in Class" winner.

Overall production for the 1941 calendar year reached 80,428 units, giving Nash slightly more than two percent of the domestic market share.

== 1942 ==
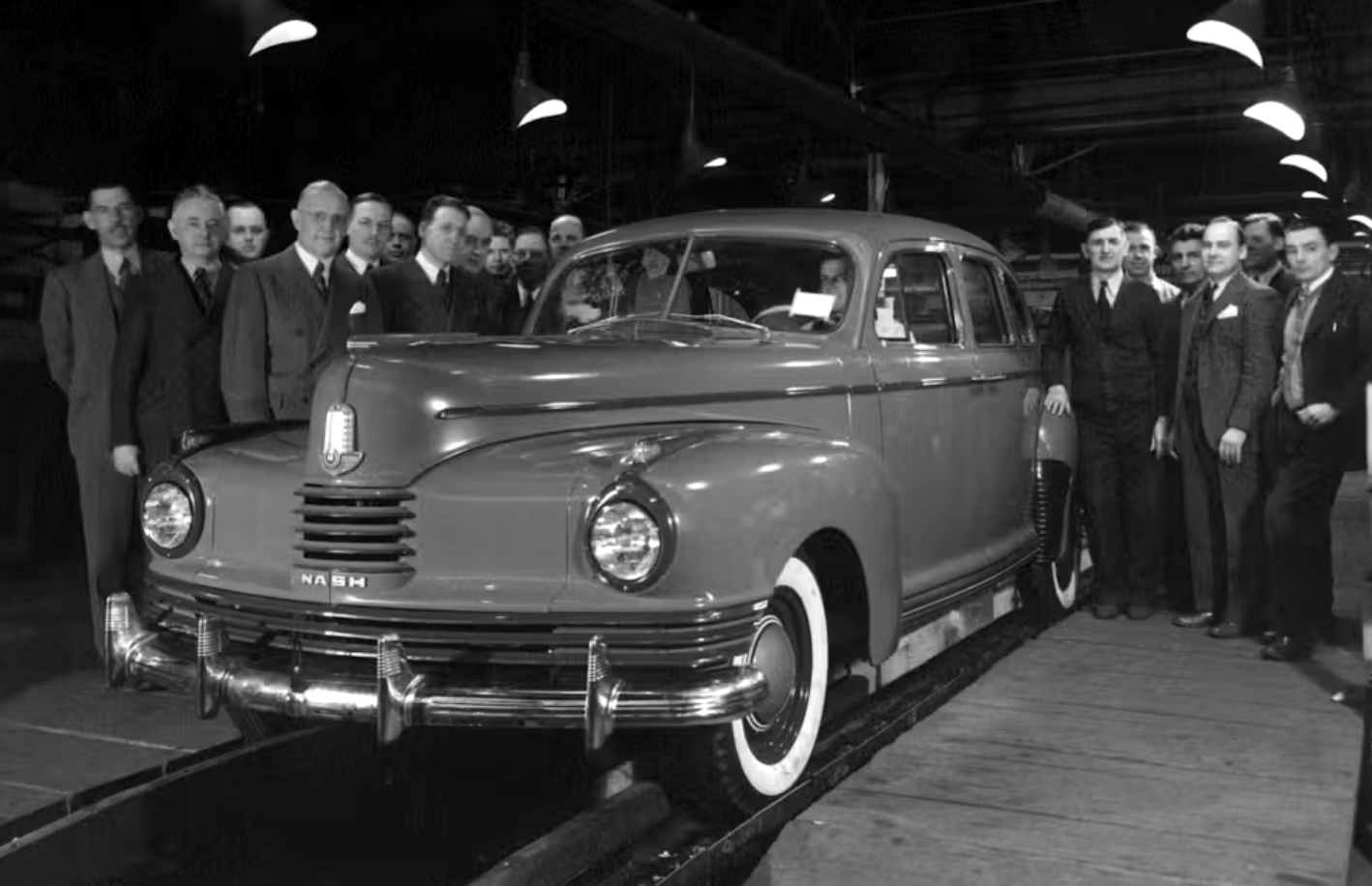
1942 Nash and last civilian car built rolling off the assembly line

For the 1942 model year, the Ambassador 600 continued as one of three distinct series marketed by Nash. A refreshed front end had prominent chrome-plated "NASH" letters integrated into the grille trim. The interior also saw upgrades, including enhanced upholstery and trim.

As the United States prepared for and entered World War II, automakers rapidly shifted their production focus to defense orders. Nash harbored hopes that the U.S. government would permit the continued, albeit highly restricted, production of the fuel-efficient Nash 600. The automaker's rationale was to maintain a vital source of new, economical vehicles for civilian use during wartime.

Approximately 5,400 examples of the 1942 Nash 600 were produced before all civilian car manufacturing was halted in 1942.

Nash received almost $100 million in non-automotive defense orders by September 1941.

== 1946 ==
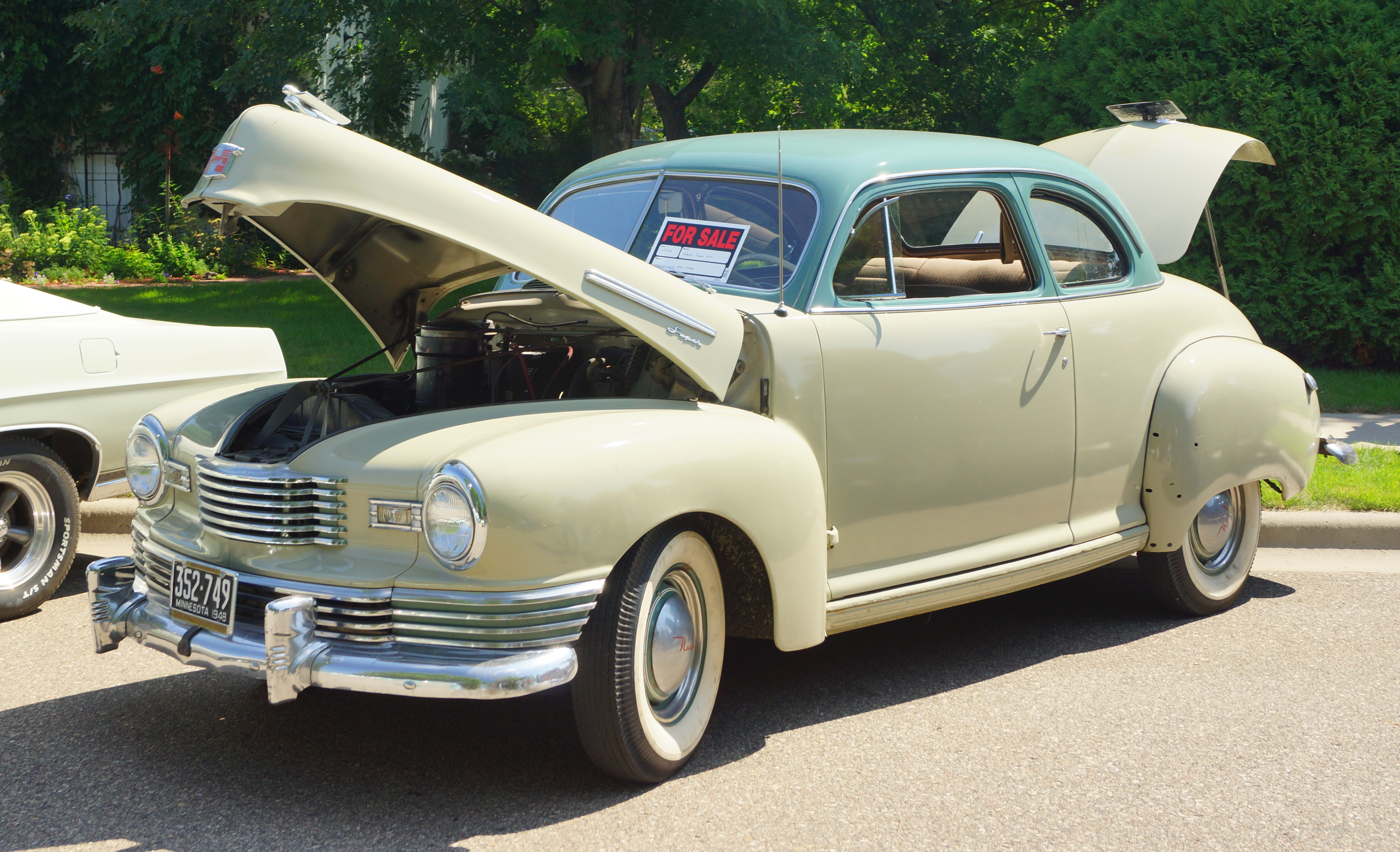
1946 Nash 600 Brougham 2-door

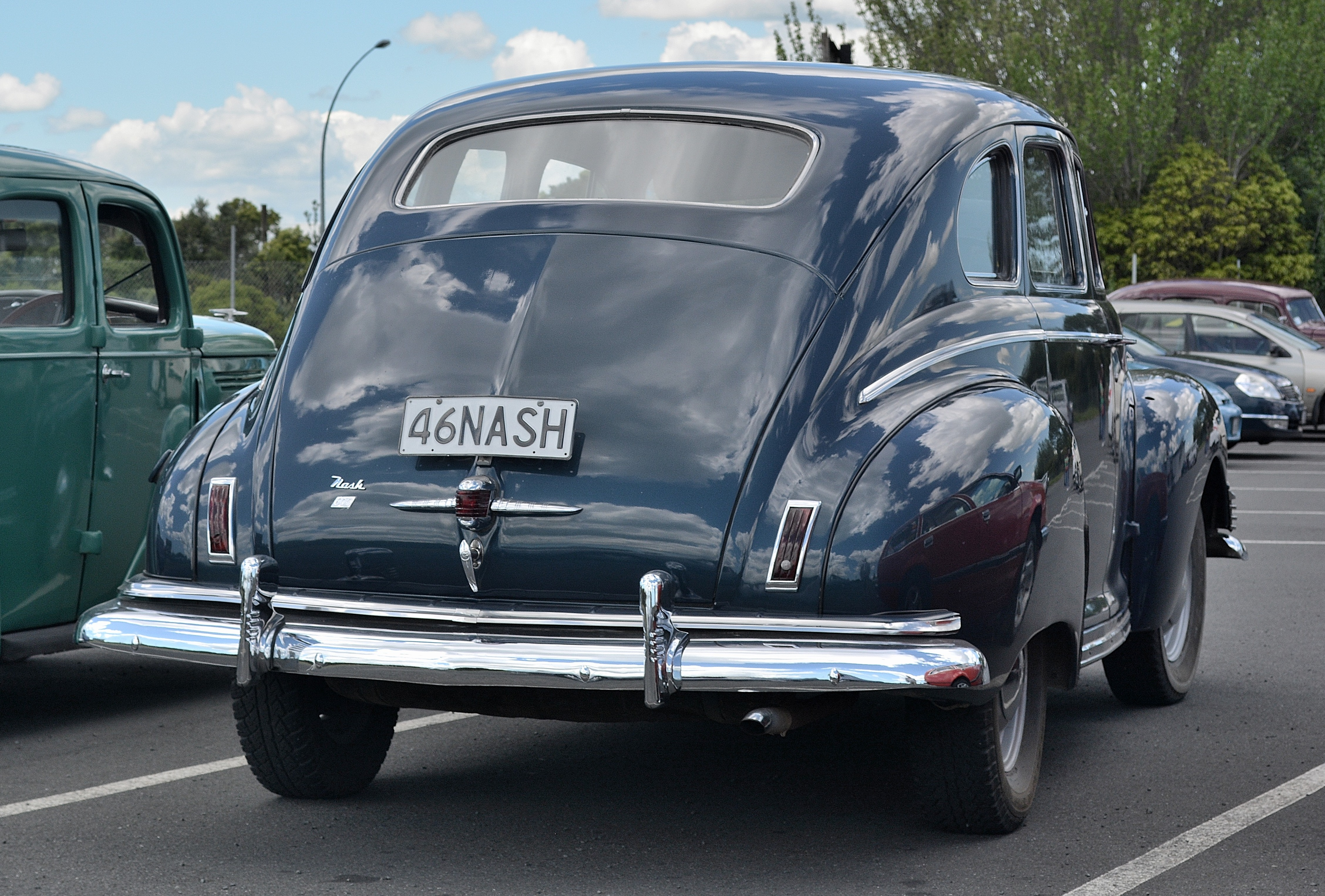
1946 Nash 600 Slipstream 4-door

Nash-Kelvinator initiated post-World War II car production on 27 October 1945, shortly after hostilities had ended. This period was characterized by an overwhelming demand for new automobiles, as the existing vehicle fleet was aging and had suffered from neglect due to wartime restrictions on parts and a shortage of skilled mechanics. Nash, like most other manufacturers, resurrected designs based on its pre-war models. The minimal changes also reflected the ongoing material shortages, retooling challenges, and labor problems that affected the entire automotive industry at the time. Nevertheless, Nash claimed the 1946 model year 600s included over 100 updates from their pre-war versions.

Nash differentiated its lineup by using the "600" nameplate for its economy-focused series. The 600 competed with Chevrolet, Ford, and Plymouth in the standard, low-price field. The "Ambassador" name was now reserved for Nash's luxury-oriented larger model.

Industrial designer, Norman Bel Geddes, was commissioned to refine the Nash 600's aesthetics. His contributions included revised trim and a projecting center section on the lower grille as well as a new dashboard. Front parking lights were new for 1946 as well as an updated Nash shield on the hood with a heavier belt line trim. The wrap-around bumpers included an adjustable rubber-mounted leveling link to allow the bumper to flex and provide noiseless alignment with the fenders.

The 600 series retained its 112 in (2,845 mm) wheelbase platform and was available in three body styles. The lowest priced was the $1,293 two-door Brougham. The four-door Slipstream was only $5 more at $1,298. The four-door Trunk Sedan was $1,342.

The 172.6 cu in (2.8 L) L-head I6 engine received updates with power increasing to 80 hp (60 kW) at 3,800 rpm. New cylinder head design increased compression ratio from 6.4 to 6.8. Enhancements were made to the cooling circulation, valve ports, intake manifold, combustion chamber shape, and valve rocker arm ratio.

Standard features included a three-speed manual transmission with greater capacity, designed and built by Nash. Included were a clutch pedal starter, a stronger drive shaft and torque tube, as well as a dual roller-type ball bearing steering assembly designed for high-load, heavy-duty applications. Nash featured its "Sand-Mortex" soundproofing and "Fabreeka" insulation as well as adding rotary non-slam door locks.

All 600s included built-in ventilation with an optional "Conditioned Air" system, an advanced, non-recirculating heater with a filtered, fan-forced, positive fresh-air pressure, enhancing interior cabin comfort. Other optional equipment included a radio with an antenna, foam-rubber seat cushions, an oil-bath air cleaner, and directional signals. The rear seat could be converted into a bed. This feature, which Nash had pioneered in 1936, allowed the rear seatback to hinge upwards, propping the cushion into a level position and creating an opening into the trunk area. The design enabled two adults to sleep comfortably within the vehicle, with their legs extending into the trunk, making the car practical for camping trips or impromptu overnight stays. This feature was particularly relevant in the post-war environment, when travel and leisure activities were more outdoor-oriented and less reliant on an extensive hospitality infrastructure.

Nash was one of the "independent automakers" that stood out in the U.S. market. The Nash advantage was the cars' body structure with over 8,000 spot welds, gussets welded within the body structure, and non-removable fenders for additional rigidity. An example of the marketing efforts designed to help differentiate the Nash for consumers was the showroom of Cooke Motor of Lexington, Kentucky. On display at the dealership was a Nash 600 turned on its side so customers could see the innovative unibody construction.

1946 Nash 600	Production
4-door Trunk Sedan	7,300
4-door Slipstream	42,300
2-door Brougham	8,500
Total	58,100

== 1947 ==
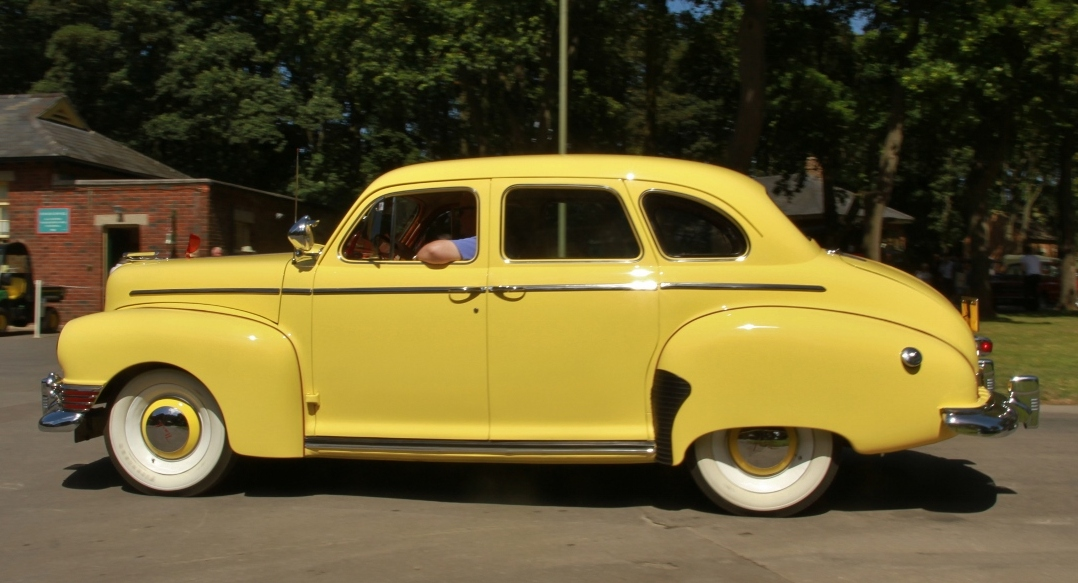
1947 Nash 600 Trunk Sedan

The 1947 model year introduced few changes to the 600 series. Continuing the three body styles, all were "Super" trim models.

A validation of the 600 series fuel economy focus was the victory in the challenging 300-mile (483 km) Death Valley Economy Run. Driven by Andy Henderson, the Nash 600 achieved 28.6 mpg_{‑US} (8.2 L/100 km; 34.3 mpg_{‑imp}) while maintaining an average speed of 36.7 mph (59.1 km/h). This performance was achieved despite the conditions of the run, which traversed steep mountains and America's hottest desert. The event was sponsored by the Hancock Oil Company of California.

In its effort to compete with larger automakers, Nash advertised the 600's capability to travel between 500 and 600 miles (805 and 966 km) on a single tank, achieving 25 to 30 mpg_{‑US} (9.4 to 7.8 L/100 km; 30 to 36 mpg_{‑imp}) at moderate highway speeds, and emphasizing the savings for owners in the post-war era when many consumers were still recovering. The "record-breaking Flying Scot" engine was promoted as the "most efficient engine in the industry".

1947 Nash 600	Production
4-door Trunk Sedan	21,500
4-door Slipstream	27,700
2-door Brougham	12.100
Total	61,300

== 1948 ==
The 1948 Nash 600 series continued in three body styles, now available in Deluxe, Super, and Custom trims. Exterior modifications included the removal of the chrome molding that had previously traversed the bodyside below the beltline. The moldings on the hood sides were shortened, and the hood badge design was updated. The Nash I6 engine was paired with a three-speed manual transmission, with Warner Gear overdrive as an additional-cost option. New "Super-Cushion" 6.40x15 tires were introduced for 1948, Goodyear's whitewall with bias-ply construction requiring only 24 psi (170 kPa; 1.7 bar) of pressure, providing a softer ride, shock cushioning, and longer life.

The 1948 Nash 600 (and the Ambassador series) incorporated the distinctive interior work of Helene Rother, Nash's newly appointed interior stylist. Rother, who had established her design studio in 1947 and counted Nash as her first client, was known for her "modern European style". She specialized in coordinating upholstery and trim colors to harmonize with specific exterior colors. Her first work was on the new "Custom" models. They included upgraded interiors with new exterior colors. The "Custom" interiors were available in Tampico Brown, Sherwood Green, and Neapolitan Blue to accentuate body colors that included Canterbury Gray Light, Winterleaf Brown, and Sunset Maroon. Interiors included soft, neutral seat fabric, complemented by door panels, headliners, assist cords, and fittings. A harmonizing leather roll design was integrated across the doors, center pillar, and rear quarters. The instrument panel was designed to match the trim in color and texture of leather through new Di-Noc graining (a film introduced by Minnesota Mining and Manufacturing Company (3M), and the instrument dials featured a modern bronze finish for both aesthetic appeal and improved visibility for the driver. Rother's design philosophy consciously aimed to appeal to the "feminine eye", emphasizing elegant, stylish, and high-quality fabrics.

The 1948 model year also included the Business Coupe body style in the Nash 600 series. This was the only post-war year that Nash produced the 600 in this configuration. Offered only in "Deluxe" trim, it was positioned as the lowest-priced model in the lineup, with a $1,478 list price. This two-door version was designed with utilitarian purpose, lacking a back seat provided ample room for samples and thus catering to traveling salesmen. Other omitted features included chrome trim, ornamentation, a sun visor, and a door armrest, emphasizing its functional, no-frills purpose. The interior was tailored in serviceable fabric, complemented by a harmonizing headliner, panels, and cream "tenite" (a plastic produced from cellulose acetate) knobs and handles. The rear compartment featured a carpeted floor behind the front seat, with the sides lined in vinyl.

The introduction of the stripped-down Business Coupe in 1948 was to achieve the lowest price point. Concurrently, the engagement of Rother and the strong emphasis on "stylish interiors" for both the 600 and Ambassador models suggested an effort to elevate the brand's perceived value, even for its more economical offerings. Rother's contributions were to elevate Nash cars to feature stylish interiors and even Nash's reputation from that of a conservative carmaker to a leader in fashionable luxury.

The small automaker had to compete effectively against the domestic "Big Three" and appeal diverse markets and demographic segments, including women, whom Rother specifically targeted with her designs. To change consumer shopping habits, print advertisements for the Nash 600 urged them to consider models available from automakers other than the Big Three, "Why not forget - just for one hour - all your feelings and opinions about automobiles - and check into a new 1948 Nash '600'?"

1948 Nash 600 production	"Deluxe"	"Super"	"Custom"
Business Coupe	925		
4-door Trunk Sedan		25,103	346
4-door Slipstream Sedan		25,044	332
2-door Brougham		11,530	170
Total = 94,220

== 1949 ==
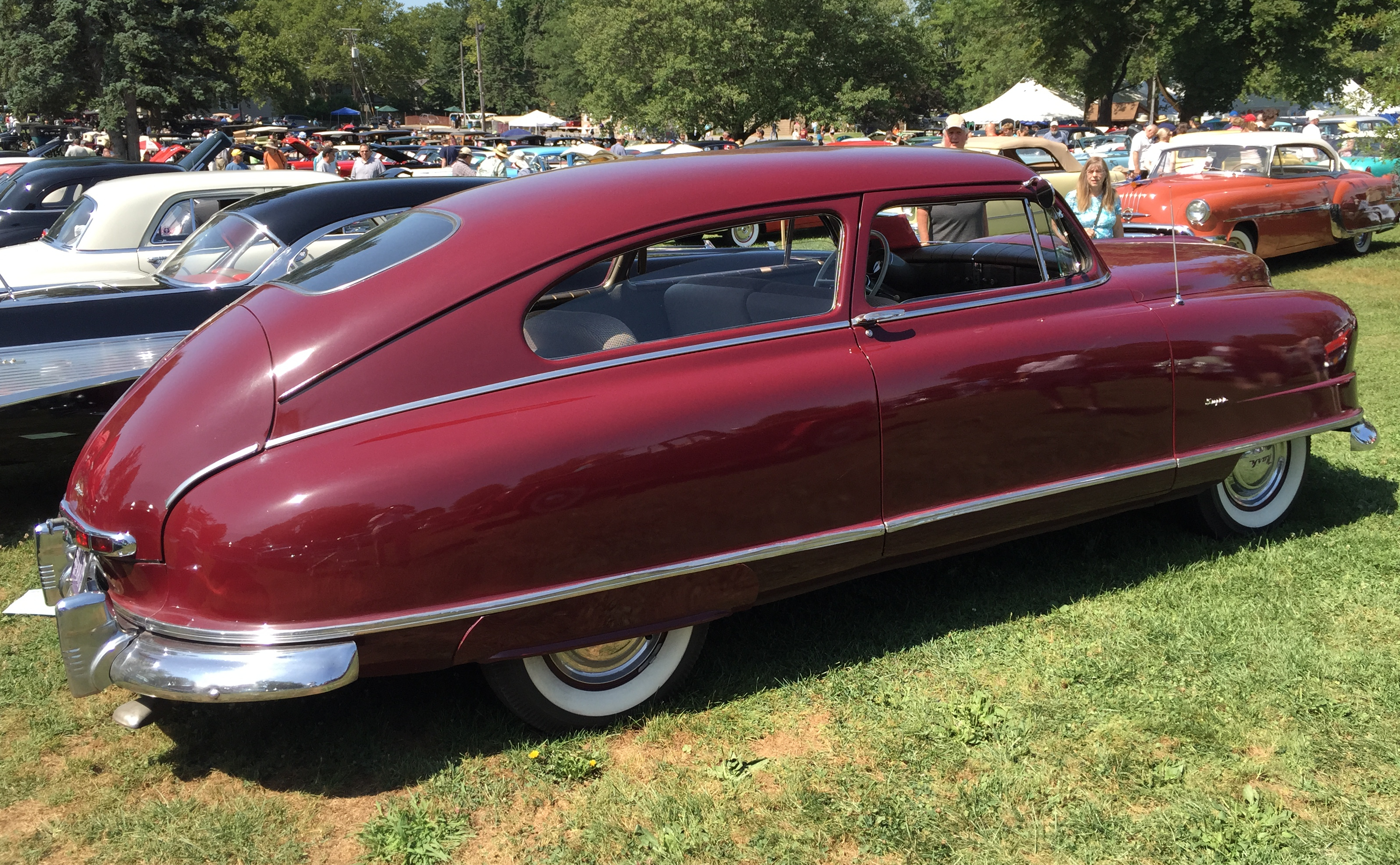
1949 Nash 600 Super two-door Airflyte

The 1949 Nash 600 marked a dramatic turn in American automotive design. The new cars from Nash featured the revolutionary aerodynamic "Airflyte" series styling, a design that, according to some critics, made them one of the most distinctive, as well as technologically advanced, cars of their era.

The genesis of the 1949 Airflyte's design began during World War II, which saw a pause in new civilian vehicle development. Former Nash designer Holden "Bob" Koto, in collaboration with Ted Pietsch, proposed a new car body in 1943 that was described as resembling an "upside-down bathtub." Although Nash management rejected their concept, the final 1949 production model mirrored their unconventional vision. The primary force behind the final design was Nils Erik Wahlberg, Nash's vice president of engineering, who championed using wind tunnel testing to develop a streamlined vehicle.

=== Exterior design ===
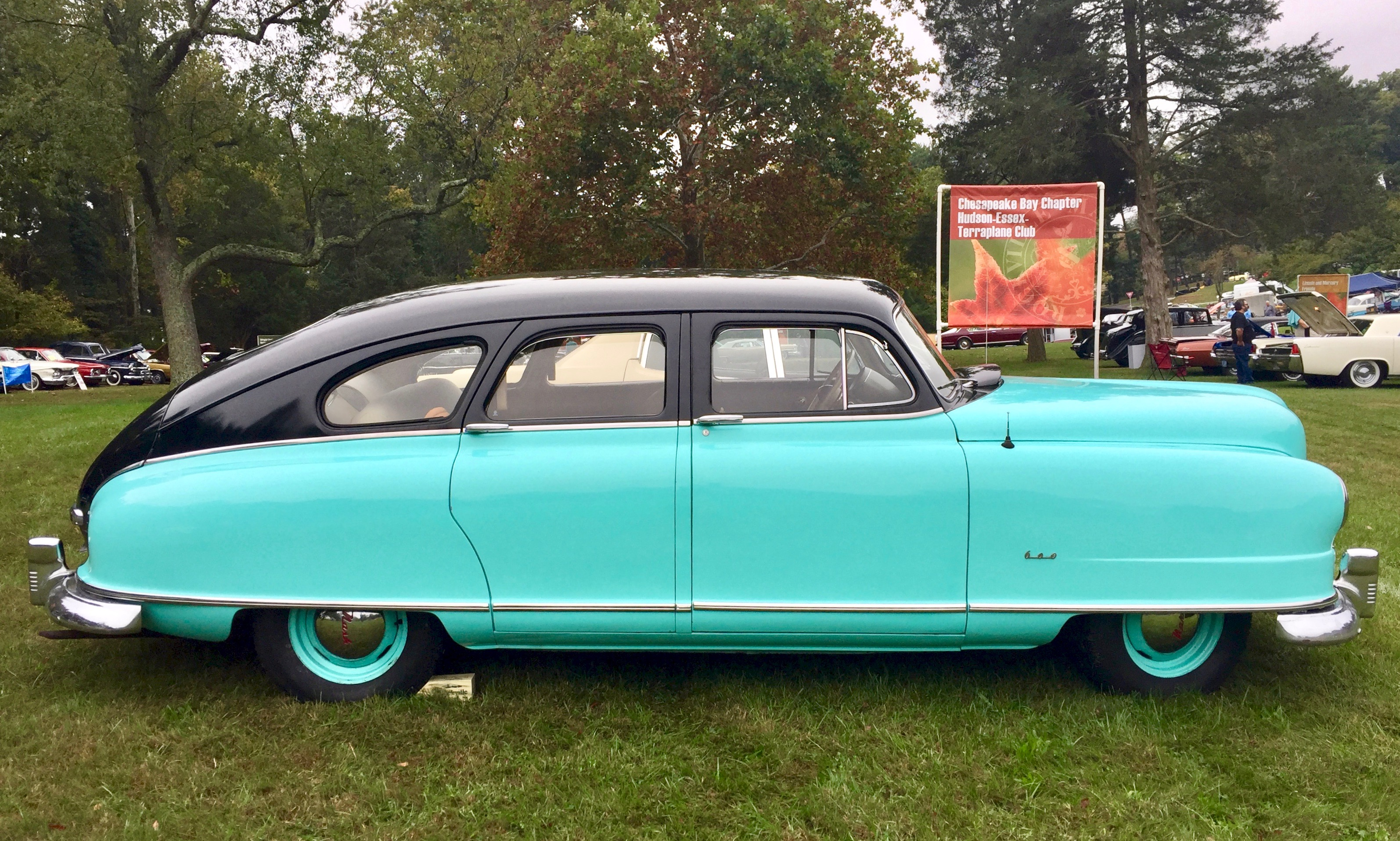
1949 Nash 600 4-door base model

The new Airflyte models stood out conspicuously among their competition, introduced after, which looked too much alike. The new cars from Nash were 6 inches (152 millimetres) lower than the 1948 models, featuring a distinctive rounded, "envelope" body with unusual enclosed fenders. This streamlined appearance, often referred to as "ponton" styling, was so unconventional for its time that detractors quickly dubbed them the "bathtub" Nashes. This envelope shape was the most streamlined form on the road. The so-called "way-out bathtub styling" made it one of the most radical and has since been described as "one of the most advanced cars of its day".

The Airflyte design was a significant step ahead of the vaguely similar to the "step-down" Hudsons and the Packard luxury models produced from 1948 through 1950. However, neither of those two automakers was into aerodynamics.

The 1949 Nash 600 series was built on a 112 in (2,845 mm) wheelbase and carried over the previous 172.6 cu in (2.8 L) I6 engine. It was positioned as the economical series, directly competing with the standard popular models from Chevrolet, Ford, and Plymouth. In contrast, the Nash Ambassador series, also part of the Airflyte line, rode on a larger 121 in (3,073 mm) wheelbase and featured a 234.8 cu in (3.8 L) overhead-valve I6 engine with a seven-main bearing design as standard. The Ambassador was the luxurious model positioned against premium brands such as Buick, Oldsmobile, Mercury, Chrysler, DeSoto, and Hudson.

=== Interior features ===
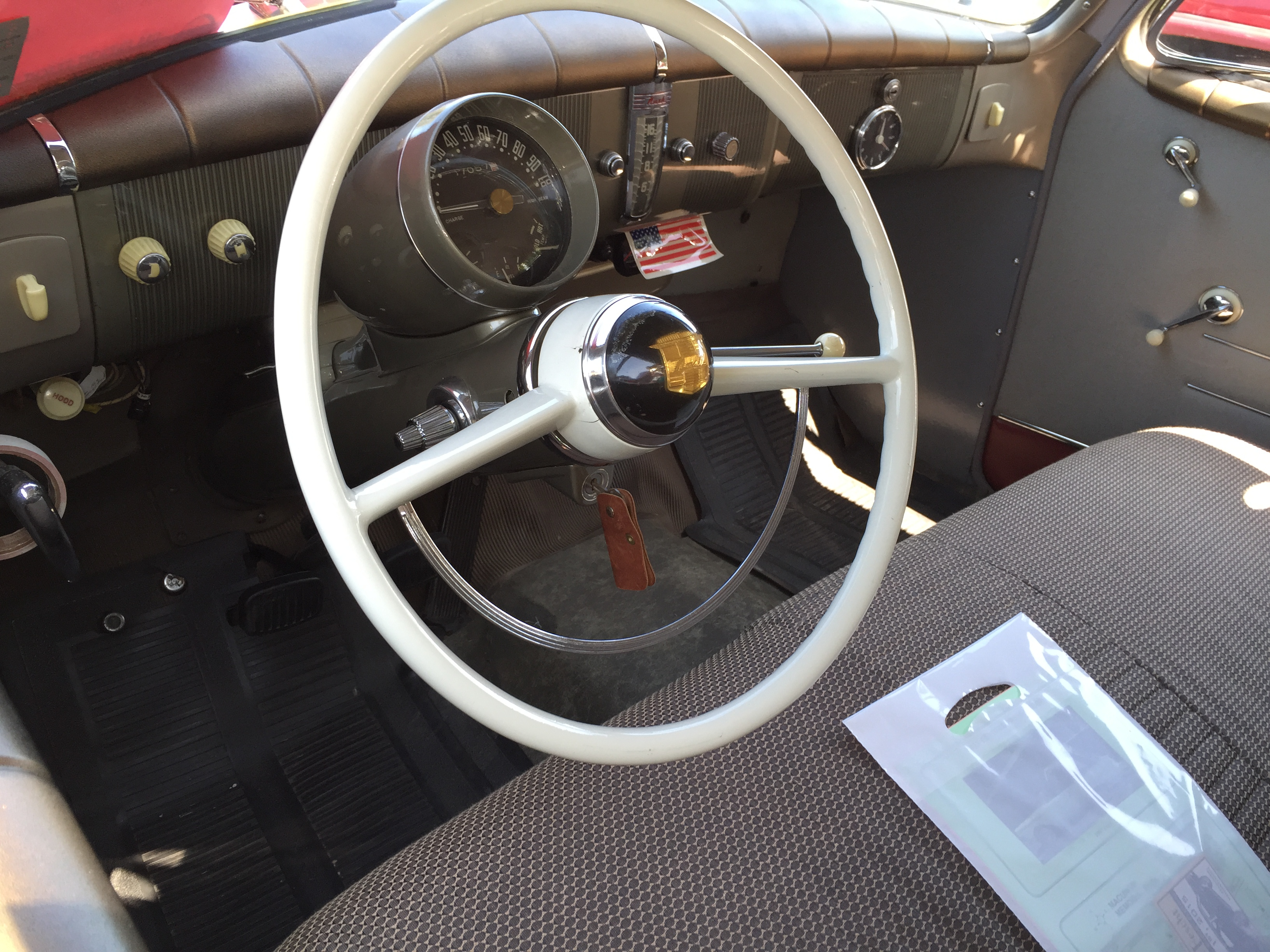
Swept away dashboard with the "Uniscope" instrument pod on the steering column

The 1949 Airflytes included numerous innovations. Reviewers described Nash's "Super-Lounge" interiors as "cavernous," offering exceptional space and comfort for occupants. A particularly distinctive interior feature was a swept-away dashboard, which provided more room for the front seat passengers. For the driver, an unusual "Uniscope" instrument pod was mounted on the steering column. This innovative instrument cluster placement aimed to bring essential gauges closer to the driver's line of sight, a concept ahead of its time.

The Nash 600 was offered exclusively as a sedan, in two- and four-door versions. Three trim series were available: Super (base), Super Special, and Custom (top trim level).

Nash continued the "Twin Bed" feature as an option, which transformed the car's interior into a comfortable double sleeping area. Adjusting the two front passenger seatbacks down to meet the bottom of the rear bench seat formed a long, upholstered horizontal surface. This design made the Nash 600 (and the similar Ambassador line) versatile, perfect for camping trips or impromptu overnight stays. Nash dealers offered accessories such as form-fitting mattresses designed to fill gaps between the seats and snap-in screens for the door windows, providing ventilation while keeping insects out.

=== Production ===
1949 Nash 600 production	"Super"	"Super Special"	"Custom"
Two-door sedan	17,006	9.605	29
Four-door sedan	31,194	2,664	199
Two-door Brougham		2,564	17
Total = 63,278

== Replacement ==
The pioneering Nash 600 was succeeded and rebranded for the 1950 model year as the Nash Statesman. The Statesman continued the 600's 112 in (2,845 mm) wheelbase. The renamed line was positioned as the mid-level offering in Nash Motors' evolving product hierarchy. It was between the newly introduced, highly innovative Nash Rambler, a compact car with a short, 100 in (2,540 mm) wheelbase, and the established top-of-the-line Nash Ambassador, which rode on a 121 in (3,073 mm) wheelbase. This product segmentation allowed Nash to cater to a range of consumers, from those seeking economy and maneuverability with the Rambler, to those desiring luxury and space with the Ambassador, with the Statesman providing an option in the middle. The original 600 series' advanced lightweight design and reputation for fuel efficiency continued in the Statesman.
