= Nash Statesman =

Full-size rear-wheel-drive Streamline Moderne sedan car produced by Nash Motors

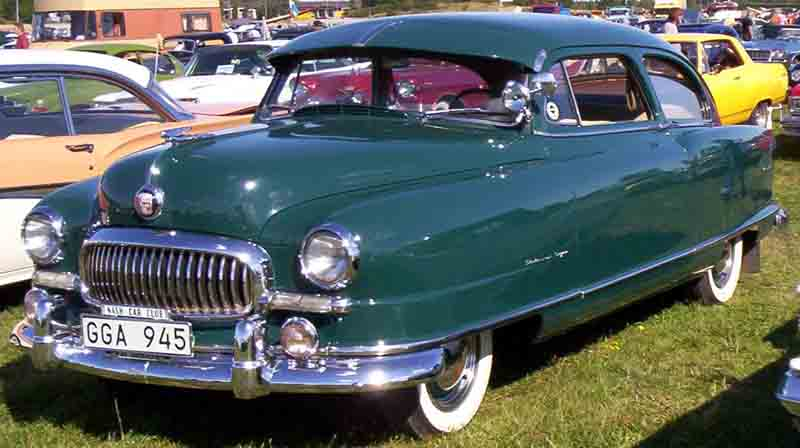
- 1951 Nash Statesman Two-Door Sedan

Overview
- Manufacturer: Nash Motors (1949–1954); American Motors (1954–1956)
- Production: 1950 to 1956 (model years)
- Assembly: Nash Factory (Kenosha, WI); Danforth Avenue Plant, Toronto Canada (1955)

Chronology
- Predecessor: Nash 600

The Nash Statesman is a full-sized automobile built by Nash Motors for the 1950 through 1956 model years in two generations.

The Statesman series was positioned below the top-line Nash Ambassador and above the compact Nash Rambler.

== First generation (1950 and 1951) ==
First generation
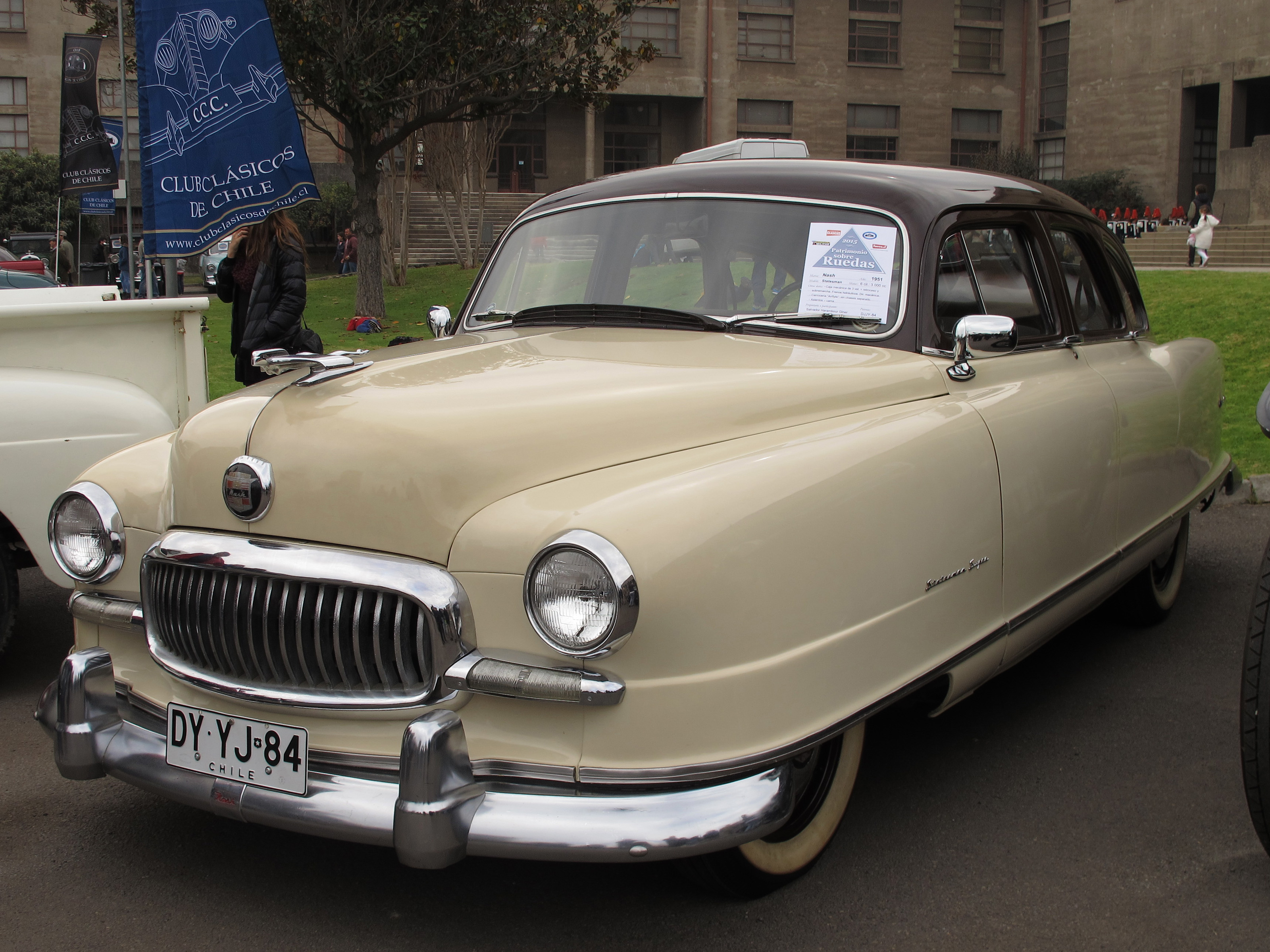
- 1951 Nash Statesman Super Four-Door Sedan

Overview
- Manufacturer: Nash Motors
- Production: 1949–1951
- Model years: 1950–1951

Body and chassis
- Body style: 2-door sedan 4-door sedan

Powertrain
- Engine: 184 cu in (3.0 L) I6

Dimensions
- Wheelbase: 112.0 in (2,845 mm)

Nash developed its post–World War II automobiles using an advanced unit-body construction with fastback aerodynamic styling under the Airflyte name, reflecting a popular 1950s styling trend. The base Nash 600 was renamed Nash Statesman for the 1950 model year. The Statesman was offered in three trims, the top-line Custom and the entry-level Super, as well as a base fleet-only model for commercial and institutional use.

The cars were available as a two- or four-door sedan. A distinguishing feature of all Nashes are the "skirted" fenders. Although the turning circle could be compromised, the front track is nearly three inches narrower to provide space for the wheels. The front track is just under 55 inches (1,397 mm) while the rear track is 60.5 in (1,537 mm).

The wheelbase of the Statesman was 9.0 inches (229 mm) shorter than that of the companion Ambassador line. This was achieved by using a shorter front "clip" (the portion of a car from the cowl forward) than was installed on the Ambassador. Statesman and Ambassador hoods, along with front fenders, are not interchangeable. However, from the cowl rearward, the two series' dimensions were identical. Two-door models included Nash's exclusive "Airliner Reclining" front seat, which was optional on the four-door sedans. These seats could be converted to form a bed.

Statesman engine designs were based on the L-head Nash Light Six engine designed in the 1920s and continued into the 1940s in the Nash LaFayette and Nash 600. The lack of intake and exhaust manifolds is characteristic of this engine. The Statesman models were comparatively lighter, resulting in fuel efficiency as reported by owners and testers.

The Statesman models, along with the Ambassador line, were the volume and profit leaders for Nash.

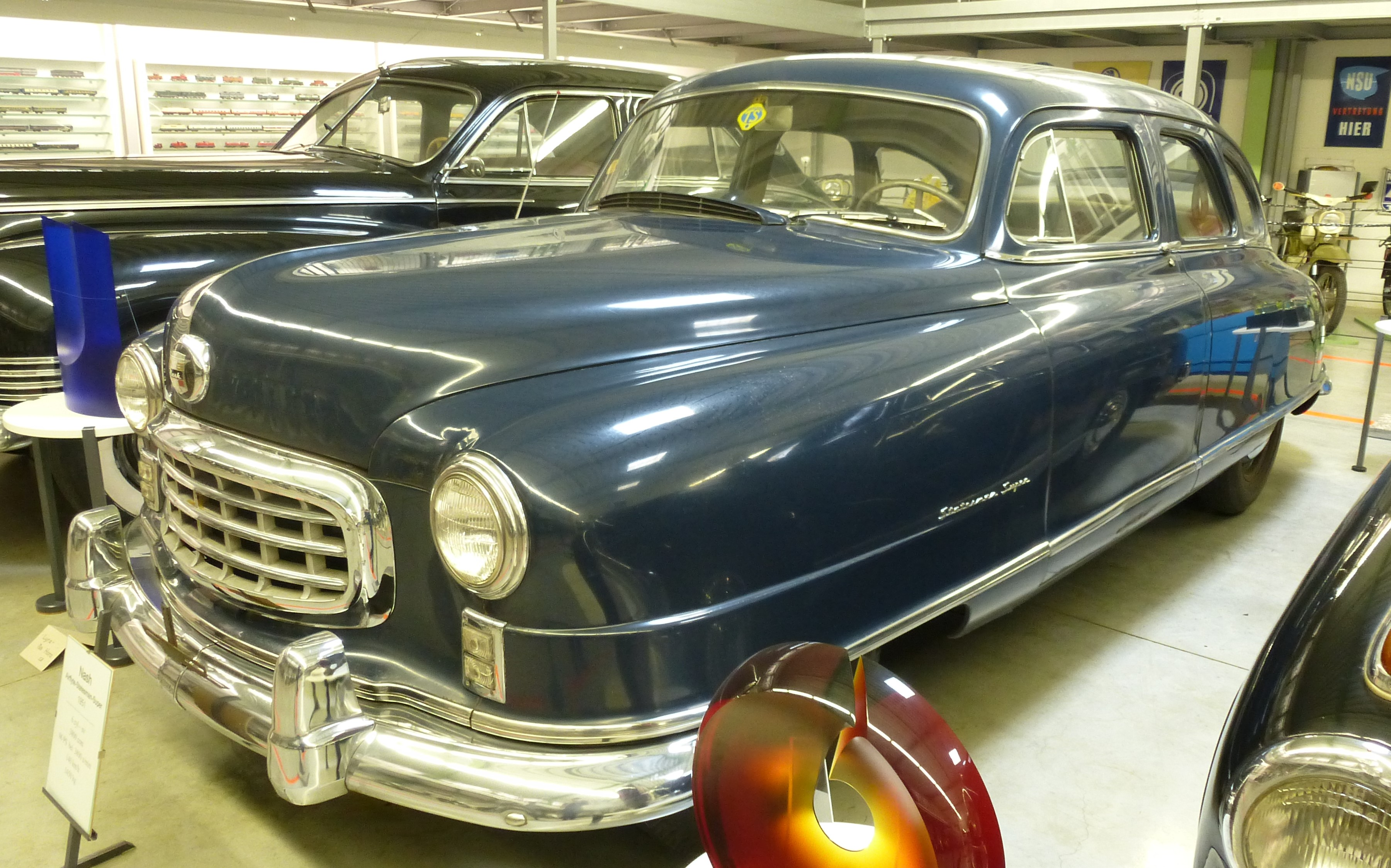
1950 Nash Statesman Super 4-Door Sedan

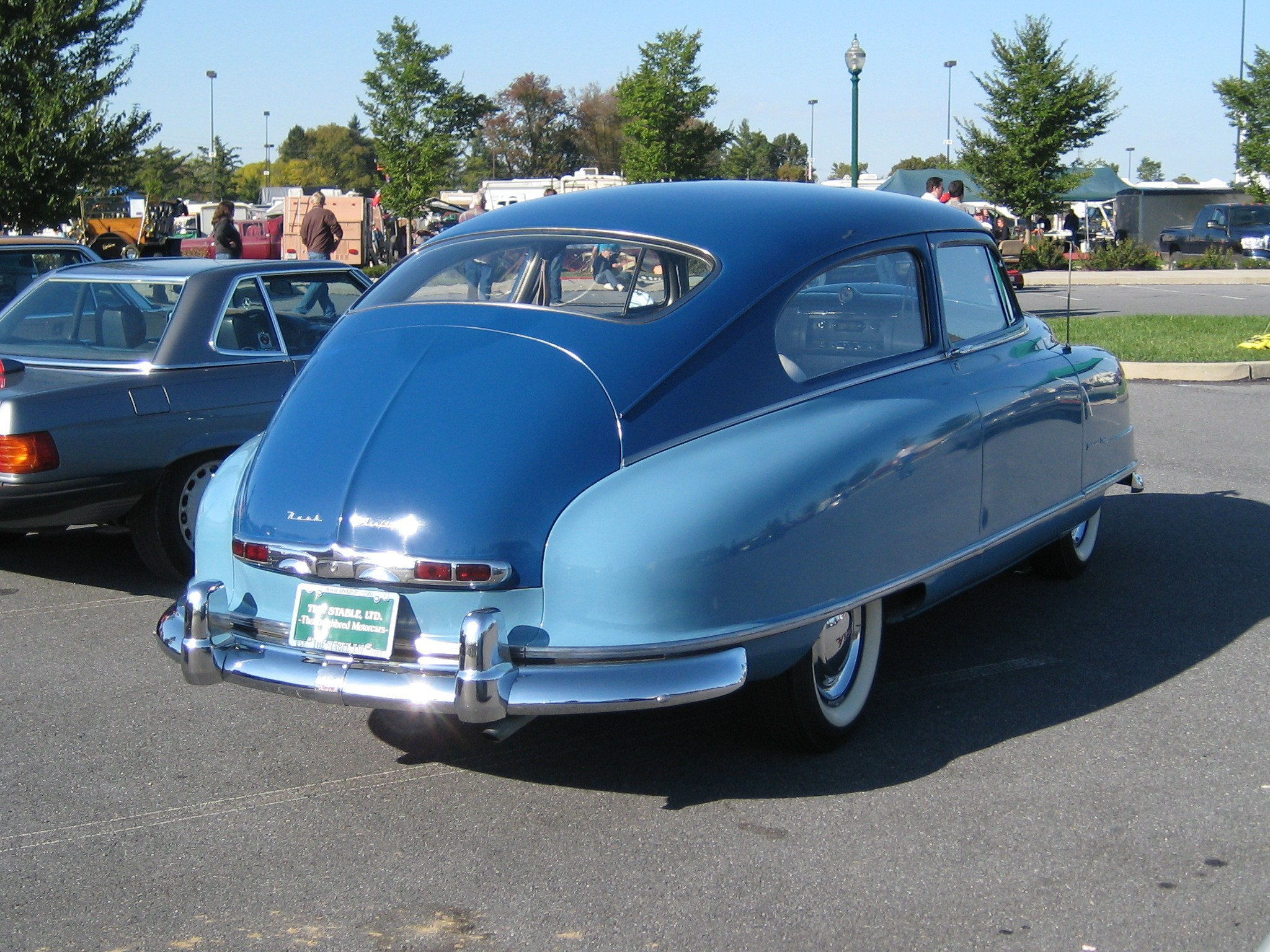
1950 Nash Statesman Super 2-door

== Second generation (1952 through 1956) ==
Second generation
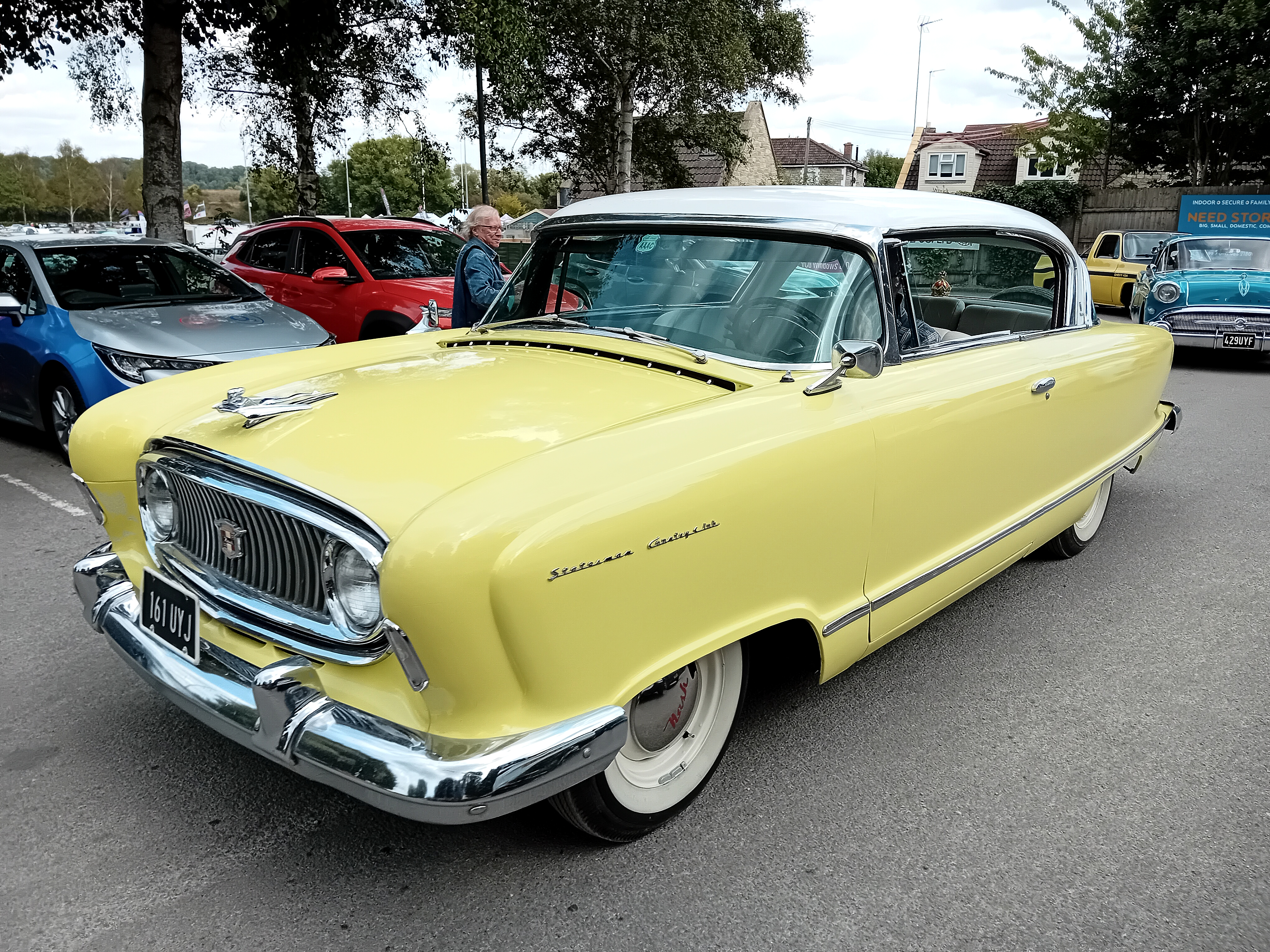
- 1954 Nash Statesman 2-door hardtop

Overview
- Manufacturer: Nash Motors (1952–1954); American Motors Corporation (1954–1956)
- Production: 1951–1956
- Model years: 1952–1956

Body and chassis
- Body style: 2-door sedan 4-door sedan 2-door hardtop

Powertrain
- Engine: 195.6 cu in (3.2 L) I6

Dimensions
- Wheelbase: 114.25 in (2,902 mm)

A new design was introduced for the 1952 model year, featuring a large "envelope-bodied" sedan with enclosed wheels that were characteristic of Nash. The all-new notchback body design coincided with Nash's 50th anniversary and included styling by Pininfarina, the Italian designer.

The Statesman's wheelbase was shortened to 114.25 in (2,902 mm). The cars were available as a two- or four-door sedan, as well as a new "Country Club" two-door hardtop body style. All were powered by the "Super Flying Scott" 195.6 cu in (3.2 L) I6 engine rated at 85 hp (63 kW; 86 PS).

The 1953 model year Statesman continued largely unchanged, but the engine was upgraded to produce 100 hp (75 kW; 101 PS) and renamed to "Powerflyte".

The 1954 Statesman models included the outside-mounted continental tire, increasing trunk space, and making emergency tire changes easier. An available engine with dual carburetors and a higher compression ratio gained 10 hp (7 kW; 10 PS).

The 1955 model year Statesman featured a facelift, a wraparound windshield, and the front door window design. The headlights and parking lamps were integrated into the grille.

The 1956 models received larger and slanted front parking lights, as well as larger tail lamps. Nash discontinued the mid-tier Statesman line with the final units built during August 1956. Starting with the 1957 model year, all full-size Nash cars were Ambassadors.

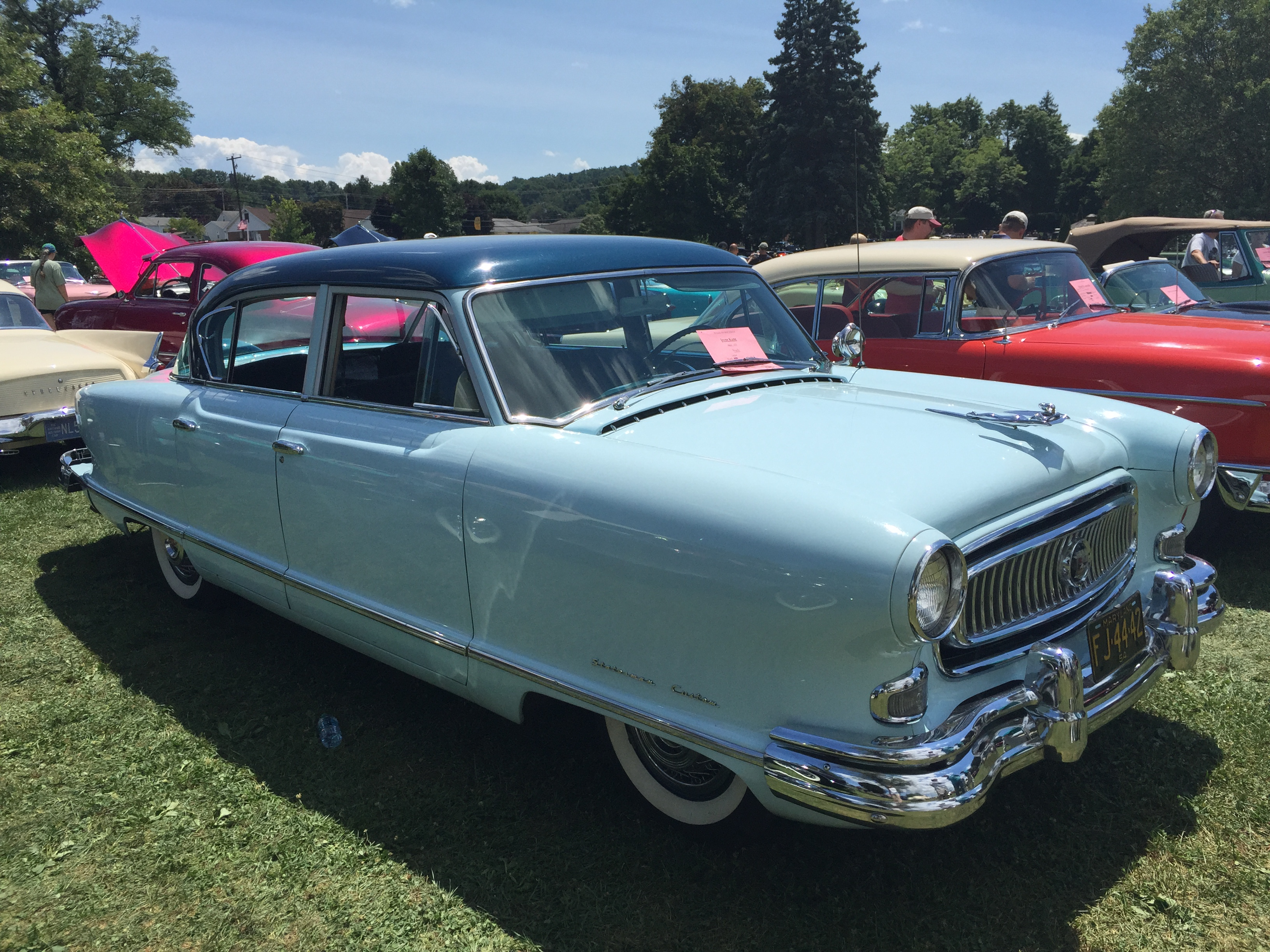
1954 Nash Statesman Custom 4-Door Sedan

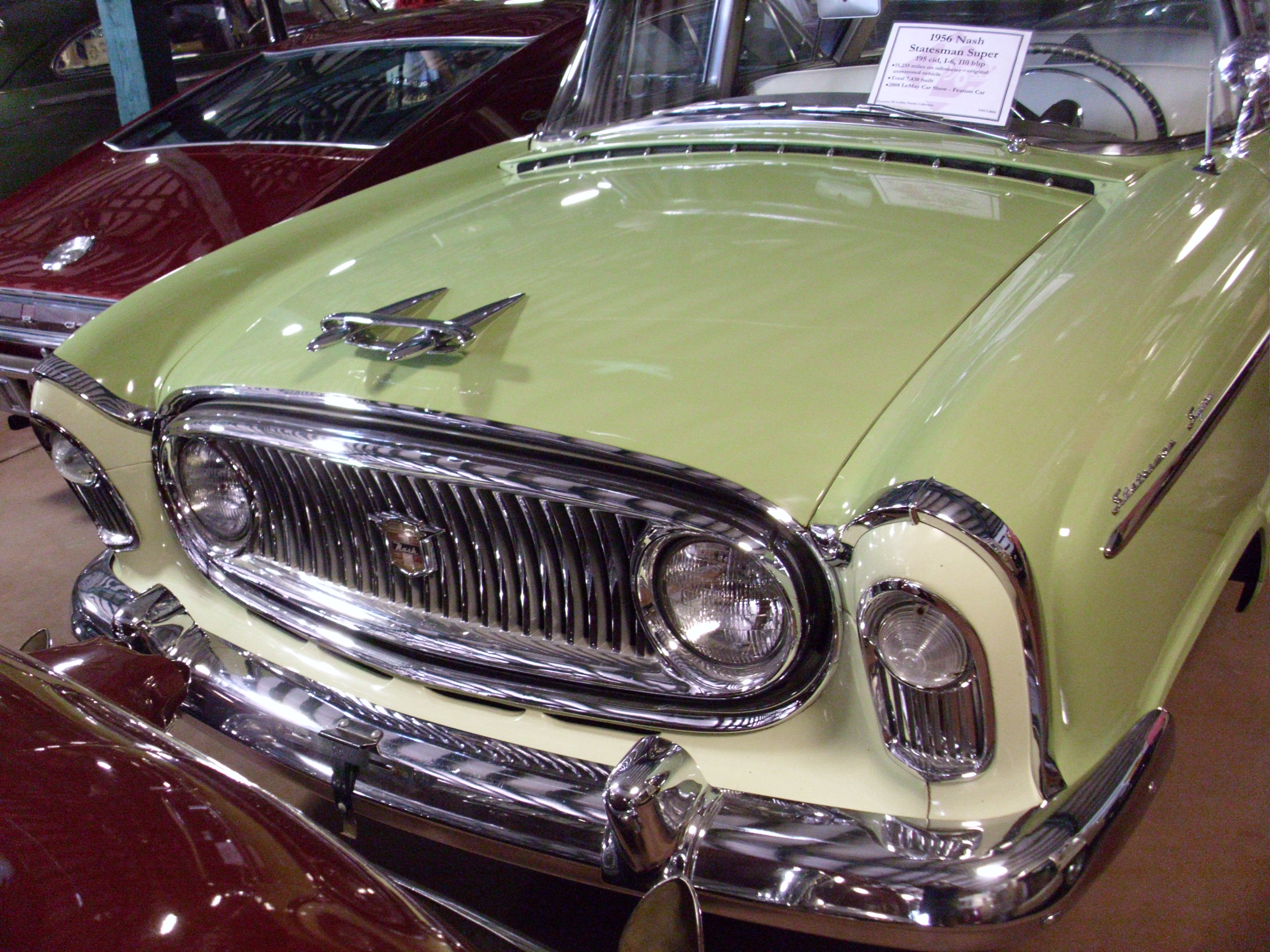
1956 Nash Statesman Super
