= Aduyevo =

Aduyevo (Russian: Адуево) is the name of several rural localities in Russia:

- Aduyevo, Kaluga Oblast, a selo in Medynsky District of Kaluga Oblast
- Aduyevo, Moscow Oblast, a village in Yermolinskoye Rural Settlement of Istrinsky District in Moscow Oblast; 55°57′N 36°58′E

== See also ==
- Aduyev
- Medyn-Aduyevo (air base)
