= Technical Museum of Vadim Zadorozhny =

Museum in Krasnogorsky, Moscow, Russia

- Музей техники Вадима Задорожного
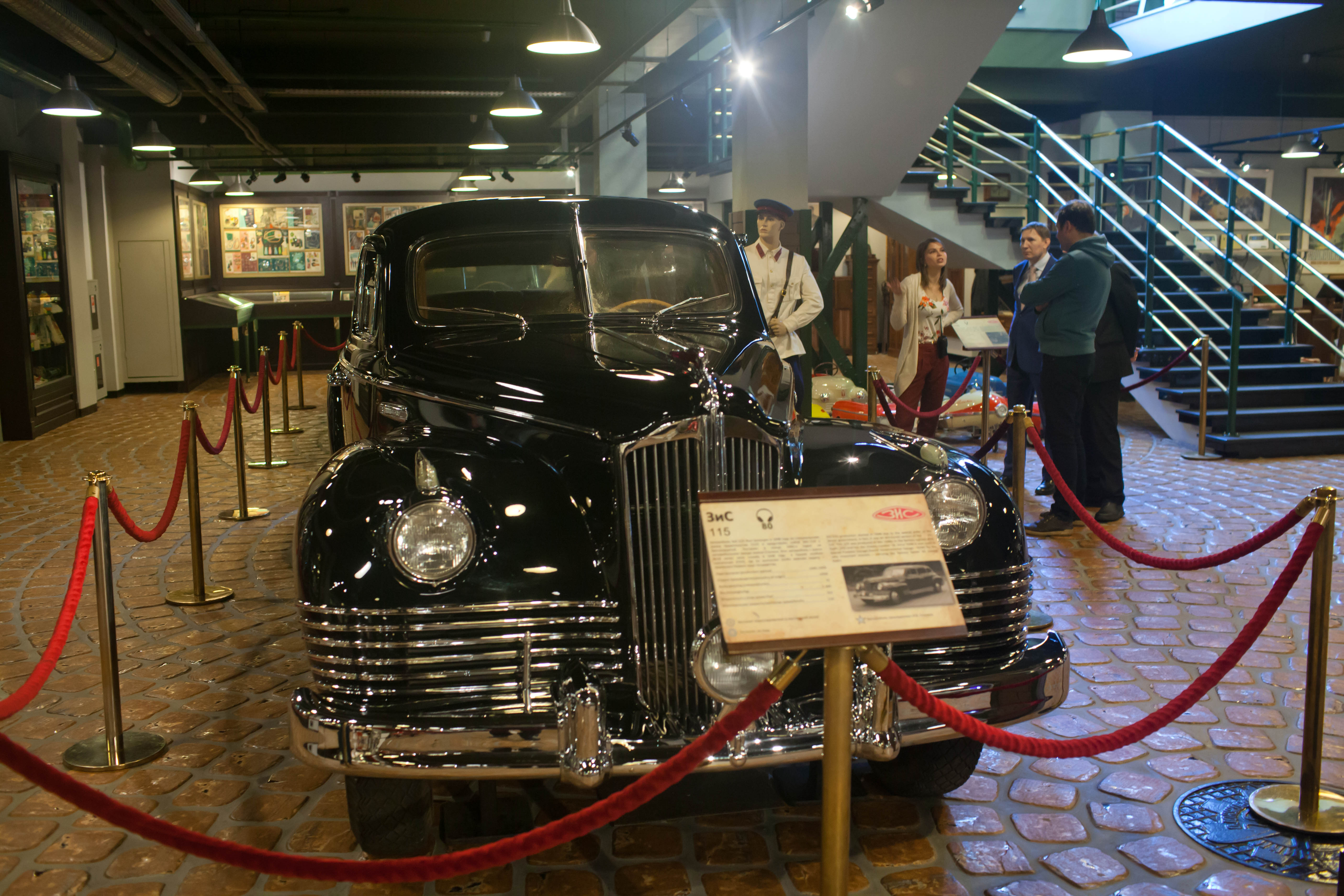
- A ZIS-115 on display at the museum

- Location within Moscow Oblast
- Established: 2001
- Location: Arkhangelsk, Moscow
- Coordinates: 55.7967°N 37.2989°E
- Type: Automotive, aviation museum
- Website: www.tmuseum.ru

Technical Museum of Vadim Zadorozhny (Russian: Музей техники Вадима Задорожного) is Russia's largest privately owned museum of technology, showcasing a wide array of retro cars, motorcycles, and military equipment. Established in 2001, it is situated in the village of Arkhangelsk within the Krasnogorsky District, Moscow Oblast.

== History ==
Vadim Zadorozhny, a former high school history teacher, began collecting cars in 1999. Two years later, he established the Automobile Club of Convertibles and Roadsters. A three-floor building was constructed in a field near Arkhangelskoye Palace and the collection was moved there in 2004. A storage building was completed the following year. A six-floor, 12,000 sq ft (1,100 m^{2}) main building opened in 2007.

By 2012 the museum had begun moving abandoned military aircraft from the former Khodynka Aerodrome to the former Medyn Airfield near Medyn, Kaluga, where it planned to establish a military-patriotic training camp.

== Objects in Exhibition ==
- Cars & Bikes (examples of objects
  - Horch (several)
  - Maybach (several)
  - Rolls Royce
  - Mercedes-Benz (several)
  - Delahaye 175
  - Delahaye 135 M "Gascogne"
  - Delahaye 135 MS
  - Alfa-Romeo 6C2500 SS
  - ZIS-115 (Joseph Stalins Car)
  - ZIS-111 (Juri Gargarins Car)
  - BMW Isetta
  - BMW R52
  - BMW R71
- Military (examples of objects)
  - OT-810 (as Sd.Kfz. 251)
  - Pz.Kpfw. 38 (t) Ausf. A
  - Pz.Kpfw. 38 (t) Ausf. E
  - Pz.Kpfw. II Ausf. B
  - StuH 42 Ausf. G (Ostkette)
  - MS-1
  - StuG III Ausf. G
  - StuG IV (late)
  - StuG III Ausf. G (sides kirts + added armour)
  - StuG III Ausf. G (Saukopf-Blende)
  - StuG III Ausf. E
  - Pz.Kpfw. III Ausf. J (late)
  - Pz.Bef.Wg. III Ausf. E
  - T-28 (Medium Tank)
  - Locomotive BR 52
  - Kesselwagen Dresden (Fuel waggon)
  - Komsomoletz
