= ZIS-110 =

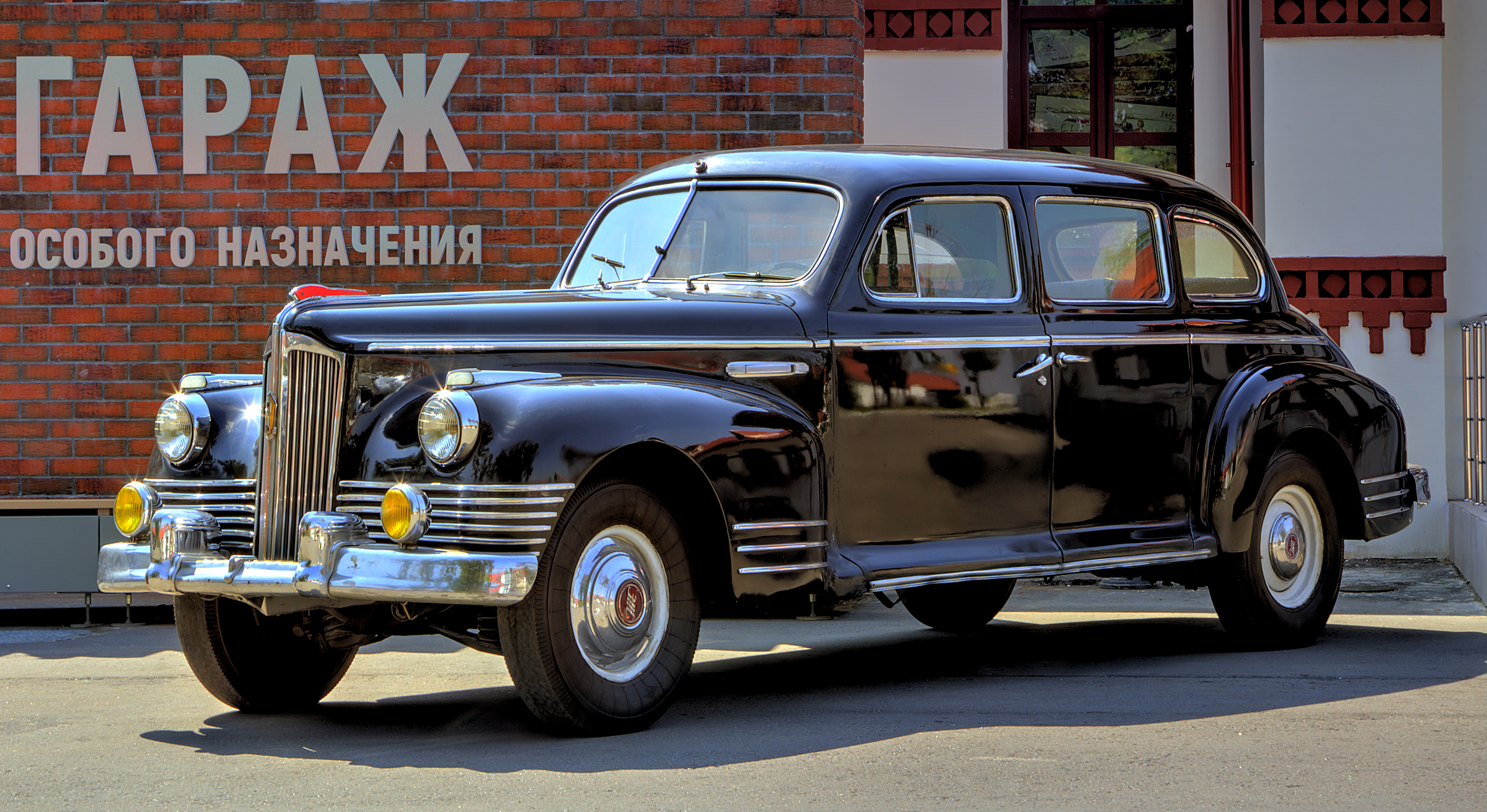

Overview
- Manufacturer: ZIS (1946–1956); ZIL (1956–1958)
- Also called: ZIL-110 (1956–1958)
- Production: 1946–1958 (possibly 1961)
- Assembly: Soviet Union: Moscow (Likhachov Plant)

Body and chassis
- Class: Full-size luxury car
- Body style: 4-door saloon (ZIS-110); 4-door convertible (ZIS-110B); 4-door ambulance (ZIS-110S)
- Layout: FR layout
- Related: ZIS-115

Powertrain
- Engine: 6.0L ZIS-110 I8
- Transmission: 3-speed manual

Dimensions
- Wheelbase: 3,760 mm (148.0 in)
- Length: 6,000 mm (236.2 in)
- Width: 1,960 mm (77.2 in)
- Height: 1,730 mm (68.1 in)
- Curb weight: 2,575 kg (5,677 lb)

Chronology
- Predecessor: ZIS-101
- Successor: ZIL-111

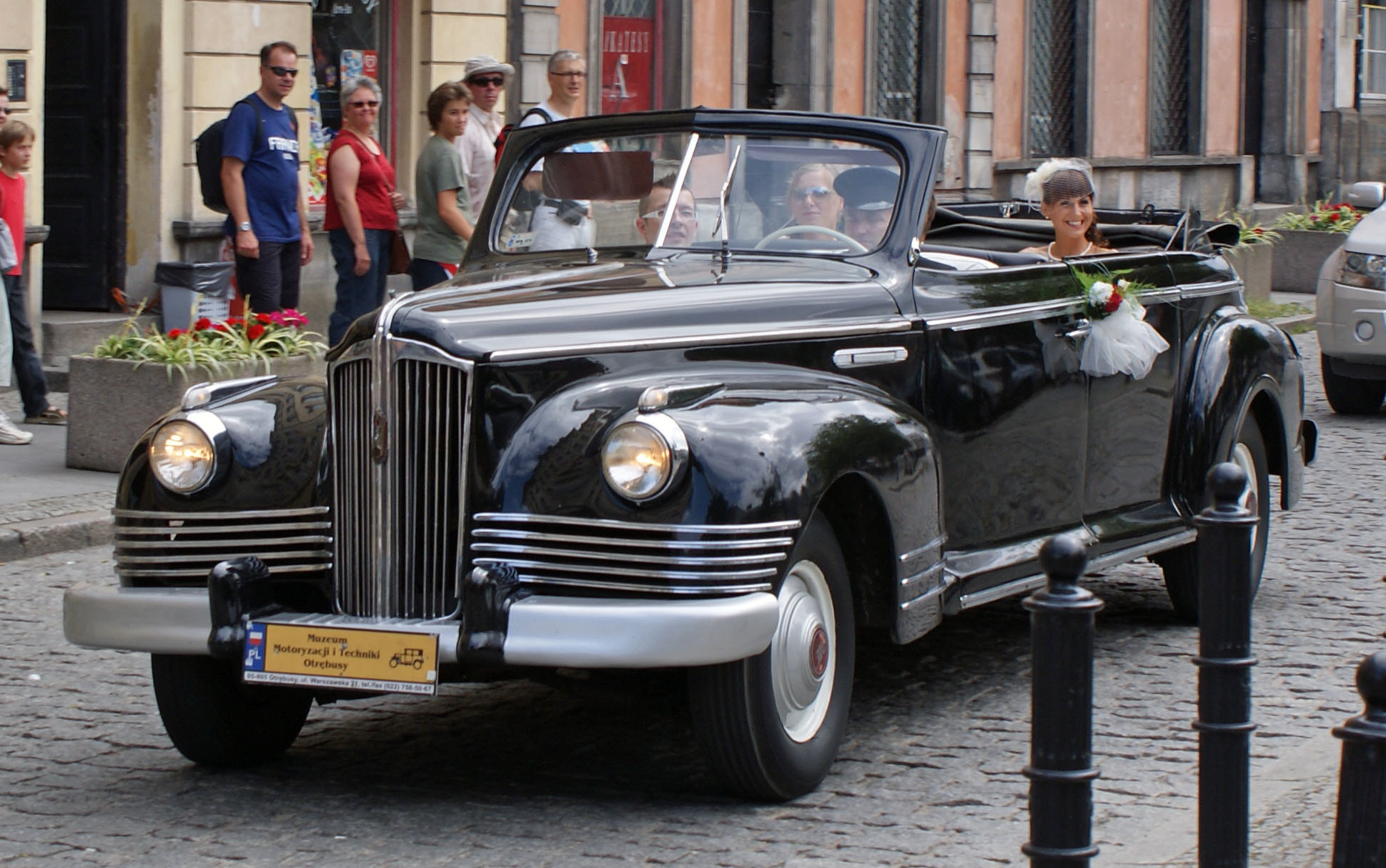
ZIS-110B Cabriolet

The ZIS-110 is a Soviet limousine produced by ZIS from 1946 to 1958.

The ZIS-110 was developed from the reverse engineering of a 1942 Packard Super Eight during 1944. The first five prototypes were completed by August 1945. It was powered by a 6-litre, straight 8-cylinder engine, producing 140 hp (104 kW) and giving a top speed of over 140 km/h (87 mph). It was made in both sedan and convertible versions.

The ZIS was rumored to use machinery from the Packard 180 assembly line which was sent to the USSR after American production ended. However, according to The Fall of the Packard Motor Car Company, there is no evidence whatsoever in the Packard archives of such a transfer. The top commissars, including Joseph Stalin, owned several Packards and wanted their first effort at a luxury car to be based on what is arguably one of the top cars of the 1940s.

These cars were often given away as gifts to foreign communist leaders such as Chinese leader Mao Zedong and North Korean premier Kim Il-sung. After Stalin, the ZIL-110B cabriolet was used as a parade car for Nikita Khrushchev and this model was also given to Enver Hoxha, the lifelong president of Albania. Ho Chi Minh, the first president of North Vietnam, also received one (most likely from the Soviet Union), which can be seen on display on the grounds of his former residence in the Vietnamese capital of Hanoi.

Production ended in 1958, with total of 2,089 cars made.

== Variants ==
- ZIS-110A: Ambulance version. Produced 1948–1958.
- ZIS-110B: Phaeton version. Produced 1947–1958.
- ZIS-110I: Prototype version with GAZ-13 Chaika powertrain.
- ZIS-110P: All-wheel-drive version.
- ZIS-110SH: Prototype all-wheel-drive version. Four built (two based on Dodge WC51 and two based on domestic units). Produced in 1949.
- ZIS-110SH: Staff car version.
- ZIS-110V: Convertible version.
- ZIS-115: Armored version.

== Notable owners ==
Famous owners of the ZIS-110 have included the following people, but most of them were often given away as gifts to foreign communist leaders.

=== Politicians ===
- Enver Hoxha
- Ho Chi Minh
- Joseph Stalin
- Kim Il-sung
- Mao Zedong
- Nikita Khrushchev
- Klement Gottwald
- Juho Kusti Paasikivi
- Urho Kekkonen
