= Packard Custom Super Eight =

Ultra-luxury flagship automobiles

Series 16-23
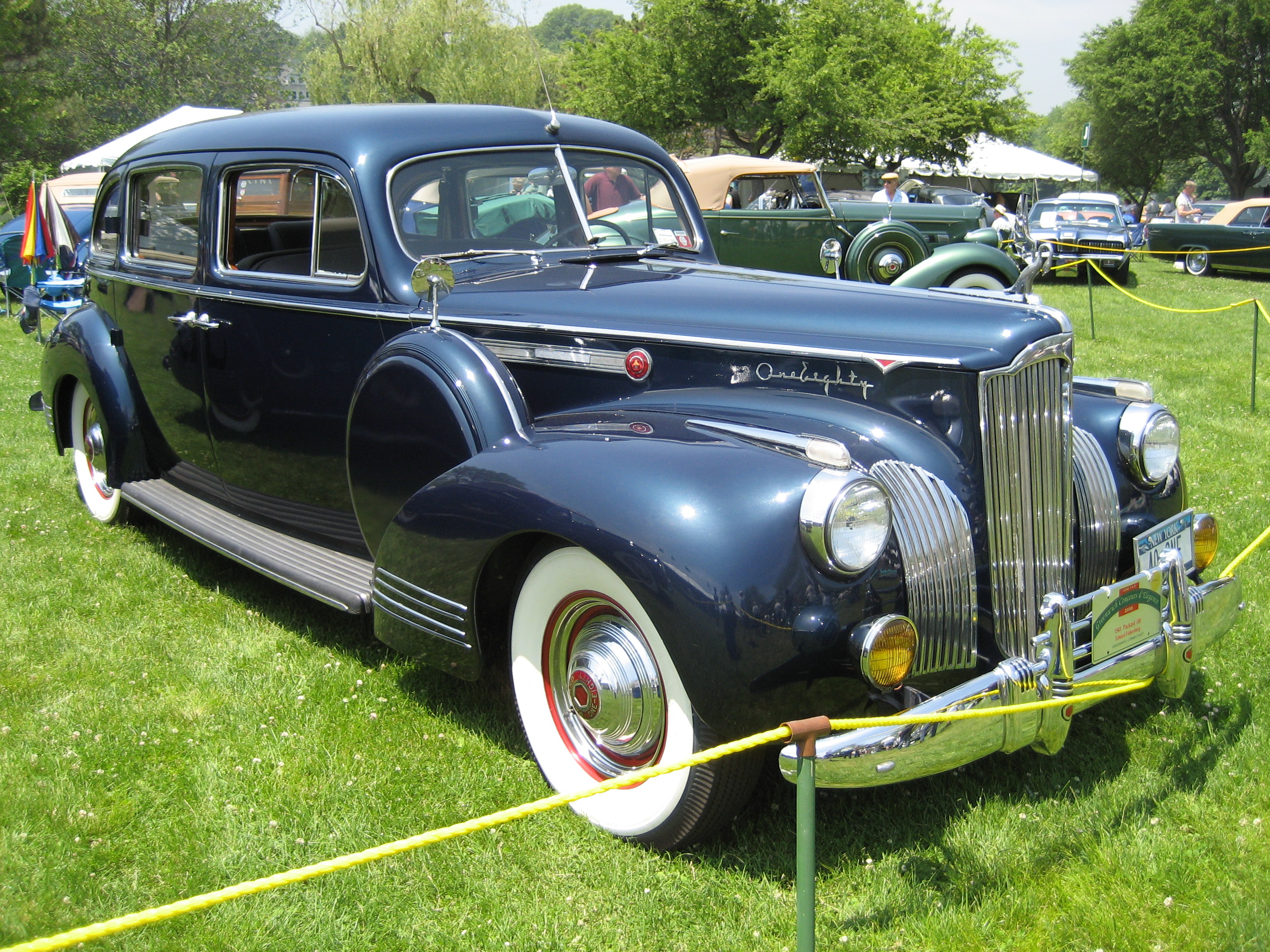
- 1941 Packard One-Eighty Touring Sedan

Overview
- Manufacturer: Packard
- Model years: 1940–1950

Body and chassis
- Class: Luxury car
- Body style: 2-door convertible; 4-door sedan; 4-door convertible; 4-door limousine; 4-door town car
- Layout: Front-engine, rear-wheel-drive
- Related: Packard Super Eight

Powertrain
- Engine: 356 cu in (5.8 L) I8
- Transmission: 3-speed manual 2-speed Ultramatic semi-automatic (introduced 1949)

Dimensions
- Wheelbase: 127 in (3,226 mm); 138 in (3,505 mm); 148 in (3,759 mm)

Chronology
- Predecessor: Packard Twelve
- Successor: Packard Patrician

The Packard Custom Super Eight One-Eighty was introduced for the 1940 model year (18th series) by the Packard Motor Car Company to replace the discontinued Packard Twelve as their top-of-the-line luxury model. The car was derived from the Packard Super Eight One-Sixty with which it shared the complete running gear including the in-line eight-cylinder, 356-cubic-inch (5,830 cc) engine that developed 180 horsepower. It was advertised as the most powerful eight-cylinder engine offered by any automobile manufacturer in 1940. (By contrast, the Cadillac Series 70 346 cubic inch V-8 developed 150 hp). It was complemented and gradually replaced by the more modern looking and mid-level Packard Clipper in 1941 and integrated into the Super Eight after the war.

Packards of all series (110, 120, 160, 180) shared similar body styling in 1940 (which some later said led to a "cheapening" of the once-exclusive luxury marque), using the same bodies with hoods and front fenders of different length to meet their respective chassis. Thus the 160 and 180 got identical bodies. However, the 180s featured finer interior detailing with the best fabrics, leather, and carpeting available. Packard used a special woolen ceiling in these cars only which was sewn longitudinally. Packard built the partition in its Limousines in a way that there was no hint of it when the partition glass was lowered, allowing the owner to use the car by himself as a sedan (thus the designation "Sedan Limousine" by Packard).

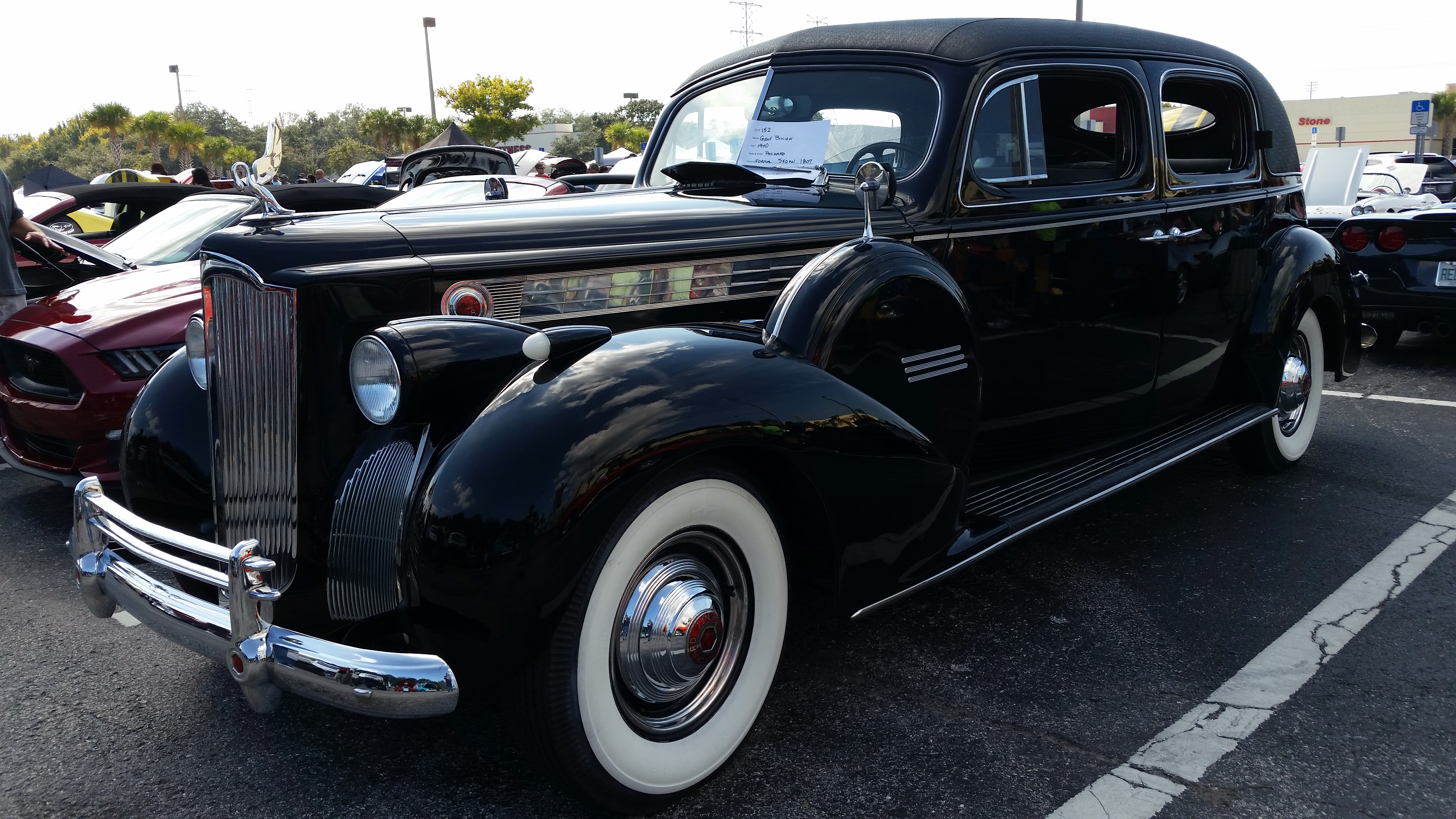
1940 Packard Custom Super Eight One-Eighty Formal Sedan (Series 1807)

In 1940, Packard made air conditioning an option. It was developed by the Henney Motor Company, with whom Packard had a long-standing business connection. Air conditioning had been used on Henney-bodied ambulances as early as 1938. It was the first time that air conditioning was available on a stock automobile. The Packard 180 was also the first car to have power windows.

In an exclusive agreement with Packard from 1937 until Henney's demise in 1954, Henney provided bodies for Packards's ambulances, hearses and flower cars, and they often provided special custom bodywork for passenger cars. The pre-World War II Henney models usually had 160-180 trim but were actually constructed on the Packard 120A 156" wheelbase chassis with the smaller 288 cubic inch engine although there were also 160 and 180 versions available.

Packard offered exclusive coachwork beginning in 1937 with the LeBaron Cabriolet body series L-394 for US$4,850 ($106,083 in 2024 dollars) and the LeBaron Town car body series L-395 for US$4,990 ($109,145 in 2024 dollars). In 1938 through 1942 Rollston and Brunn & Company offered several custom coachwork options to the exclusive list.

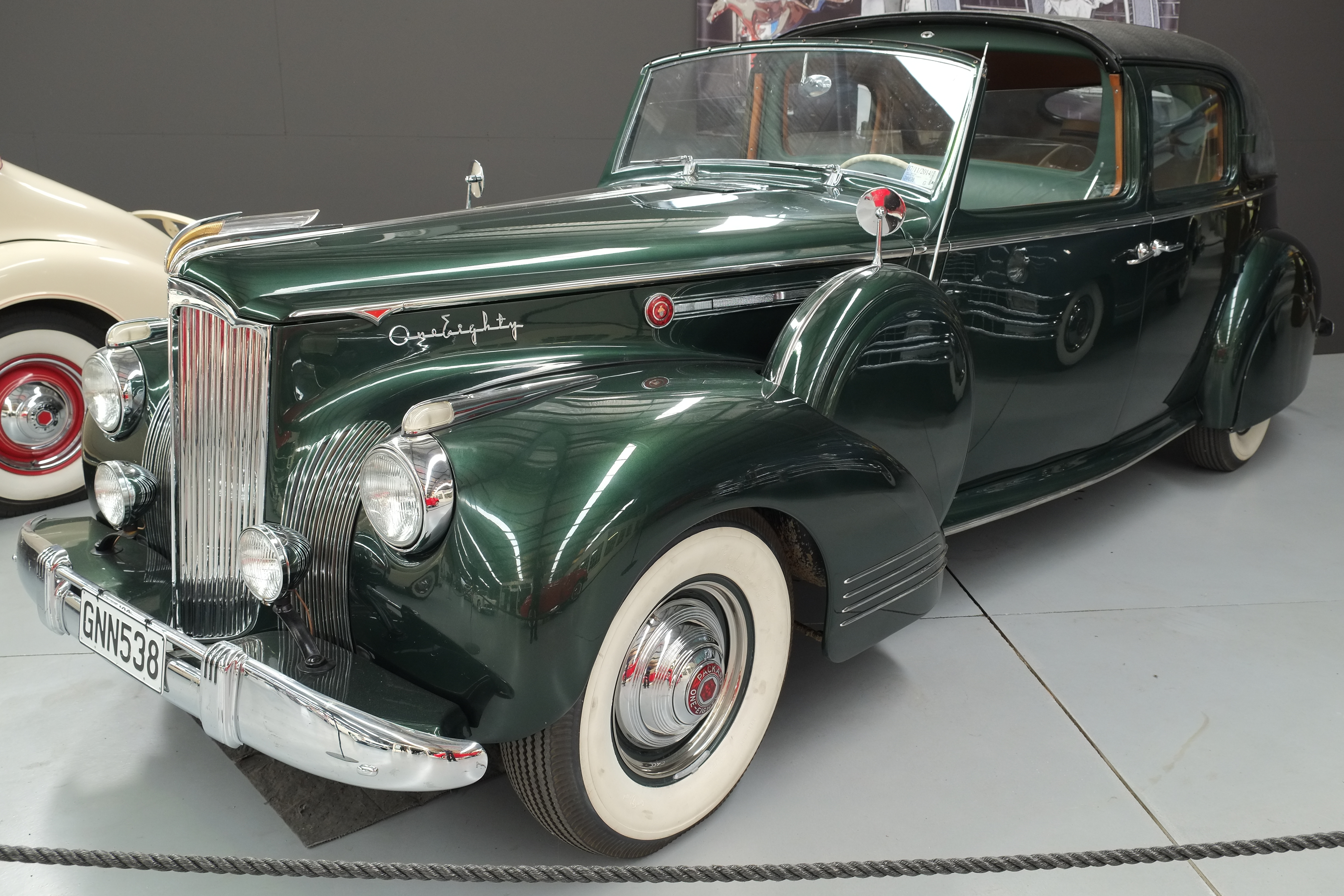
1942 Packard Super Eight One-Eighty All Weather Town Car by Rollston (Series 2008)

There were minor styling changes in the 1941 and 1942 models (19th and 20th series), the most notable of which were the moving of the headlamps into the fenders. Also for the first time, running boards could be deleted with a rocker panel put in their place to cover the chassis, and two-tone paint schemes were available. New for 1941 was the Electromatic Drive, a vacuum-operated clutch system for the conventional 3-speed manual transmission. Packard's own automatic transmission, the Ultramatic, would not be ready until 1949.

The final 180s rolled off the Packard assembly line in February 1942, as production restrictions of World War II brought a halt to civilian automobile production. There have been allegations that dies for both Junior and Senior models were sold to the Soviet Union during World War II, and production continued until 1959 as the ZIS-110. James Ward found no supporting evidence in the Packard archives of such a transfer. Also, the ZIS-110 shares no sheet metal with any Packard, despite the fact that its external decor elements were intentionally designed to heavily resemble pre-war Packards, favoured by Stalin after he had received a '38 Super Eight convertible sedan as gift from Franklin D. Roosevelt.

== Darrin-bodied cars ==
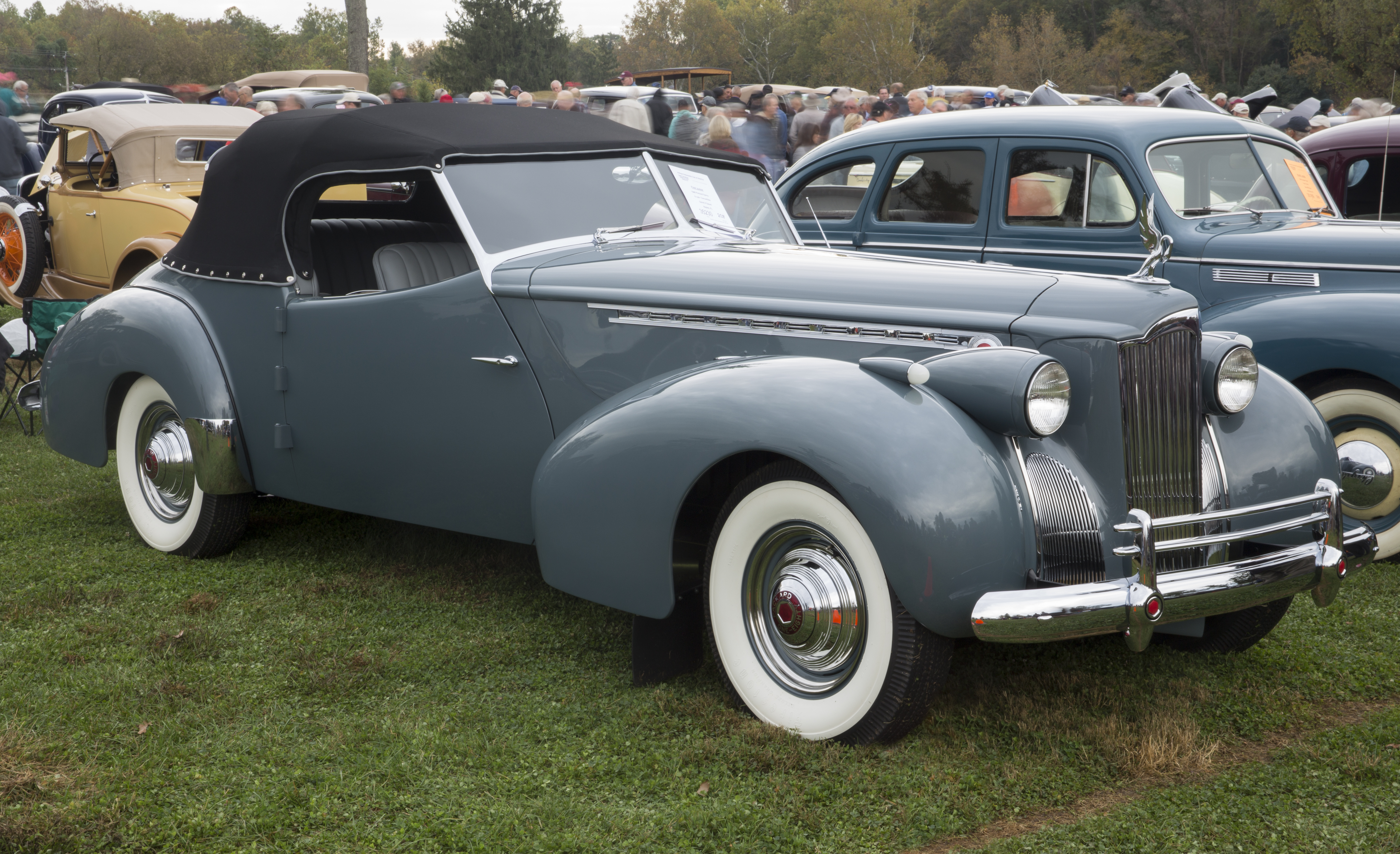
1940 Packard One Eighty Convertible Victoria by Darrin

Designer Howard "Dutch" Darrin had made a few special bodies on Packard-basis, beginning in 1937. He tried to sell Packard on the idea of Darrin-bodied cars being offered directly by Packard, and finally got his way after parking one if his creations outside the Packard dealers' annual conference. For the 1940 model year, three Darrin bodystyles were available: the closed four-door Sport Sedan, the four-door Convertible Sedan, and the two-door Convertible Victoria. About 100 Packard Darrins were built until 1942, when production of private cars ended because of the war. This was much fewer than planned.

Building even this number of cars would have overstretched Darrin's Hollywood workshops so they were built by American Central Manufacturing - one of the last remnants of the Auburn-Cord-Duesenberg conglomerate - in Connersville ("Little Detroit") Indiana instead. Darrin would travel back and forth between California and Indiana supervising construction. This work was shifted to Sayers & Scovill in Cincinnati (the company became Hess & Eisenhardt in 1942) to let ACM concentrate on building Jeep bodies. Between 59 and 72 Packard Darrins were built in 1940, of which 44 (or 48) were One-Eighties and the remainder One-Twenties. For the 1941 and 1942 model years the four-door Darrins were discontinued, leaving only the Convertible Victoria.

== Custom Super Clipper (1946-1947) ==
When production returned for civilian use October 1945, the Popular Clipper name was used on all Packard models, and the top level car was named the Custom Super Clipper, essentially using the same prewar technology with minor appearance updates. The brightwork used minimally was stainless steel instead of chrome, and interior fabrics were wool upholstery, broadcloth or leather as the buyer selected. Until an all new model could be introduced, the Custom Super Clipper used the standard Clipper passenger compartment body with front fender and hood extensions to accommodate the longer wheelbase, and the model identification was inscribed below the front door vent window. Optional equipment included a heater, AM-radio, rear wheel fender skirts, Electromagnetic Clutch, full-wheel covers and white sidewall discs that complemented the 15" wheels. A total of 1,472 Custom Super Clippers were manufactured for 1946, 5,690 for 1947 with the most expensive Model 2250 listed for $4,668 ($65,735 in 2024 dollars) for the limousine, putting it in competition with the Cadillac Fleetwood Sixty Special, Lincoln Continental and Chrysler Imperial Crown.

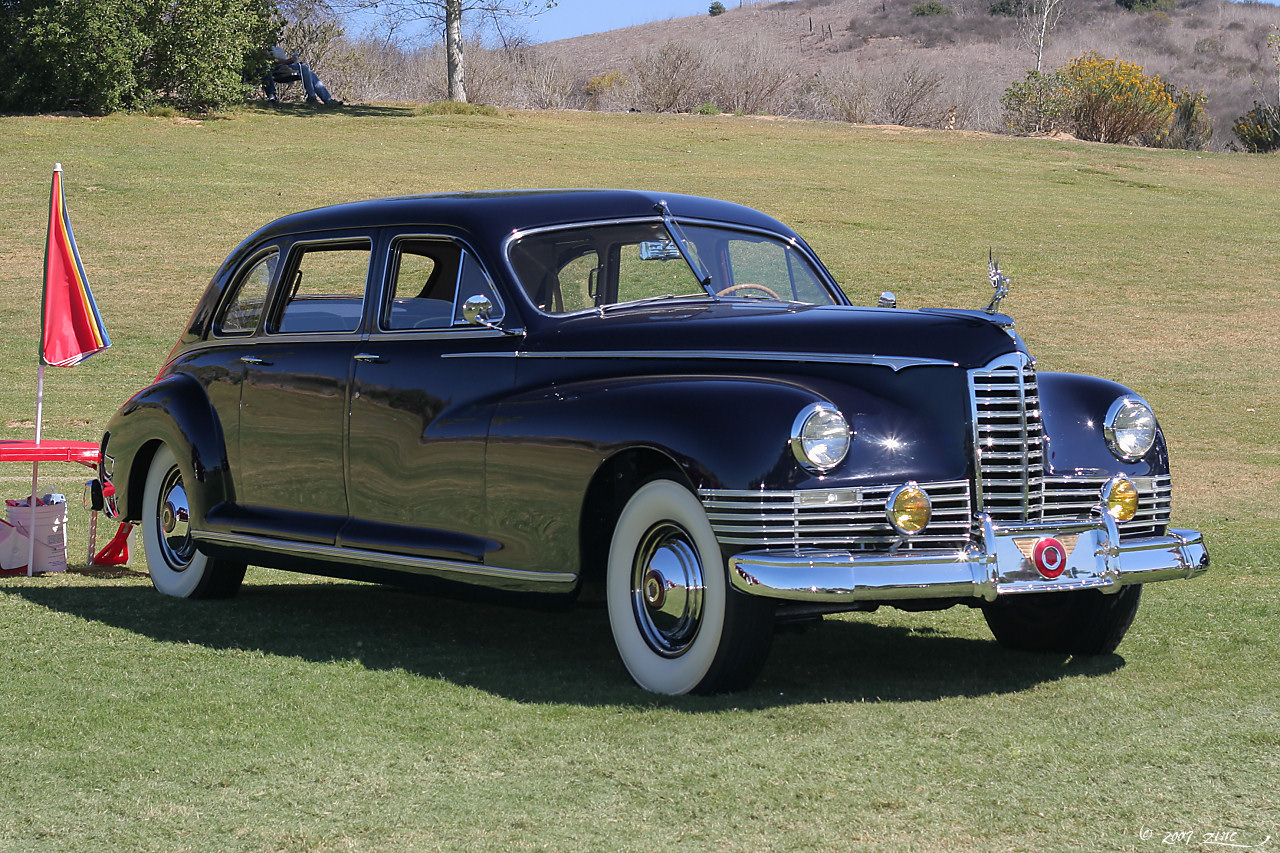
1947 Packard Custom Super Clipper Henney Limousine Series 2126

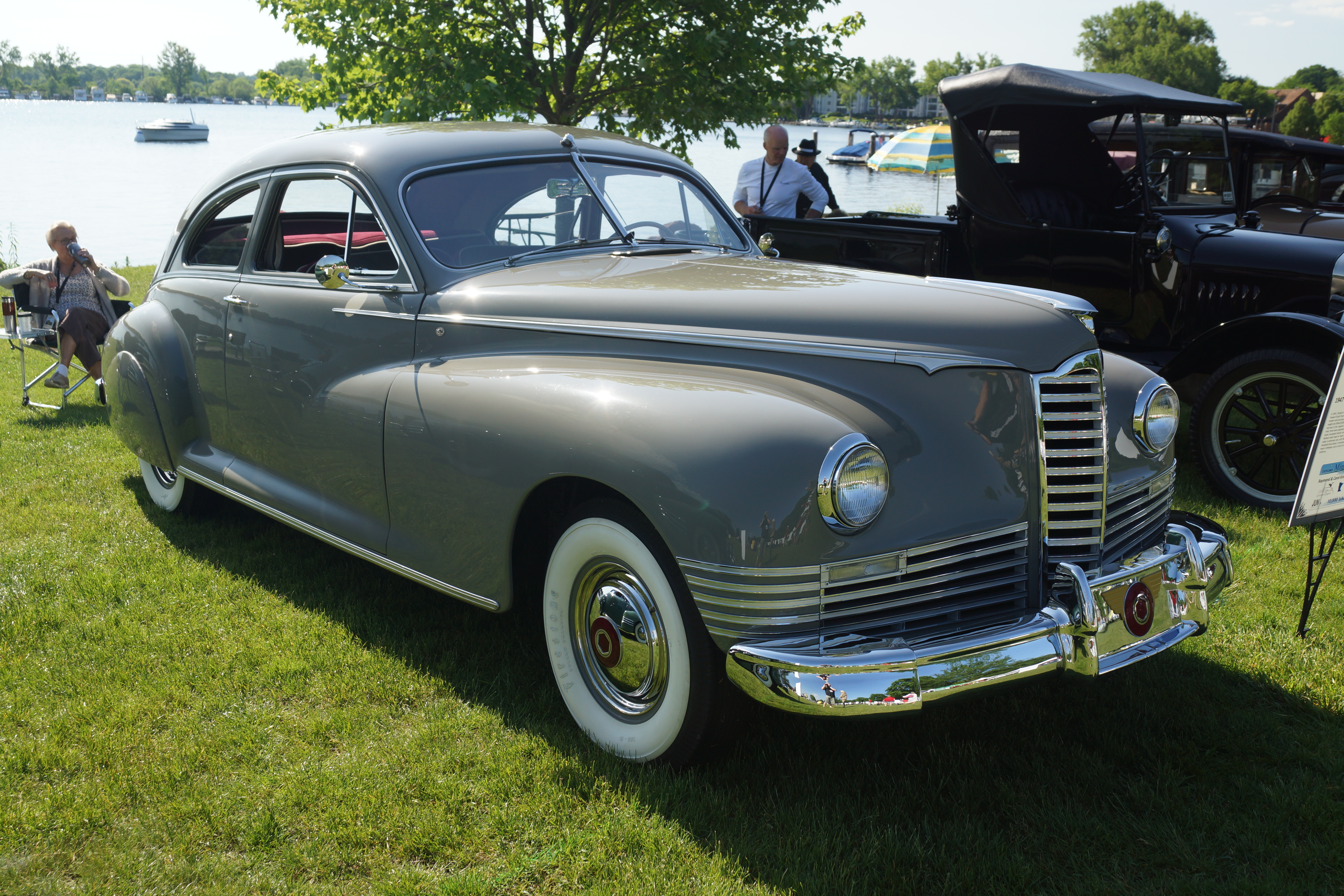
1947 Packard Custom Super Clipper 2-Door Club Sedan Series 2106

== Custom Super Eight (1948-1950) ==
An all-new streamlined appearance, commonly called ponton, was offered by Packard, and the Series 22 Custom Super Eight replaced the Custom Super Clipper and was the top-level trim package sedan, limousine and convertible. The "free-flow" slab-sided appearance was shared with all Packards and senior trim levels could be distinguished with an egg-crate grille, and horizontal bars below the traditional "ox-yoke" grille that wrapped around to the front wheel opening. The overall appearance was distinctive, with Packard winning several awards for the design, including the "Fashion Car of the Year" from the New York Fashion Academy. The "Winged Goddess" cormorant hood ornament was introduced, intended to evoke the popular appearance from Packards of the 1930s. The 2-door Club Sedan was joined with the first convertible offered since 1942, called the Victoria Convertible Model 2259, and was available with the Super and Custom Super trim packages. Custom Super trim packages could be identified by having two stainless steel body trim at the bottom edge of the body, while Super trim did not have them after 1949.

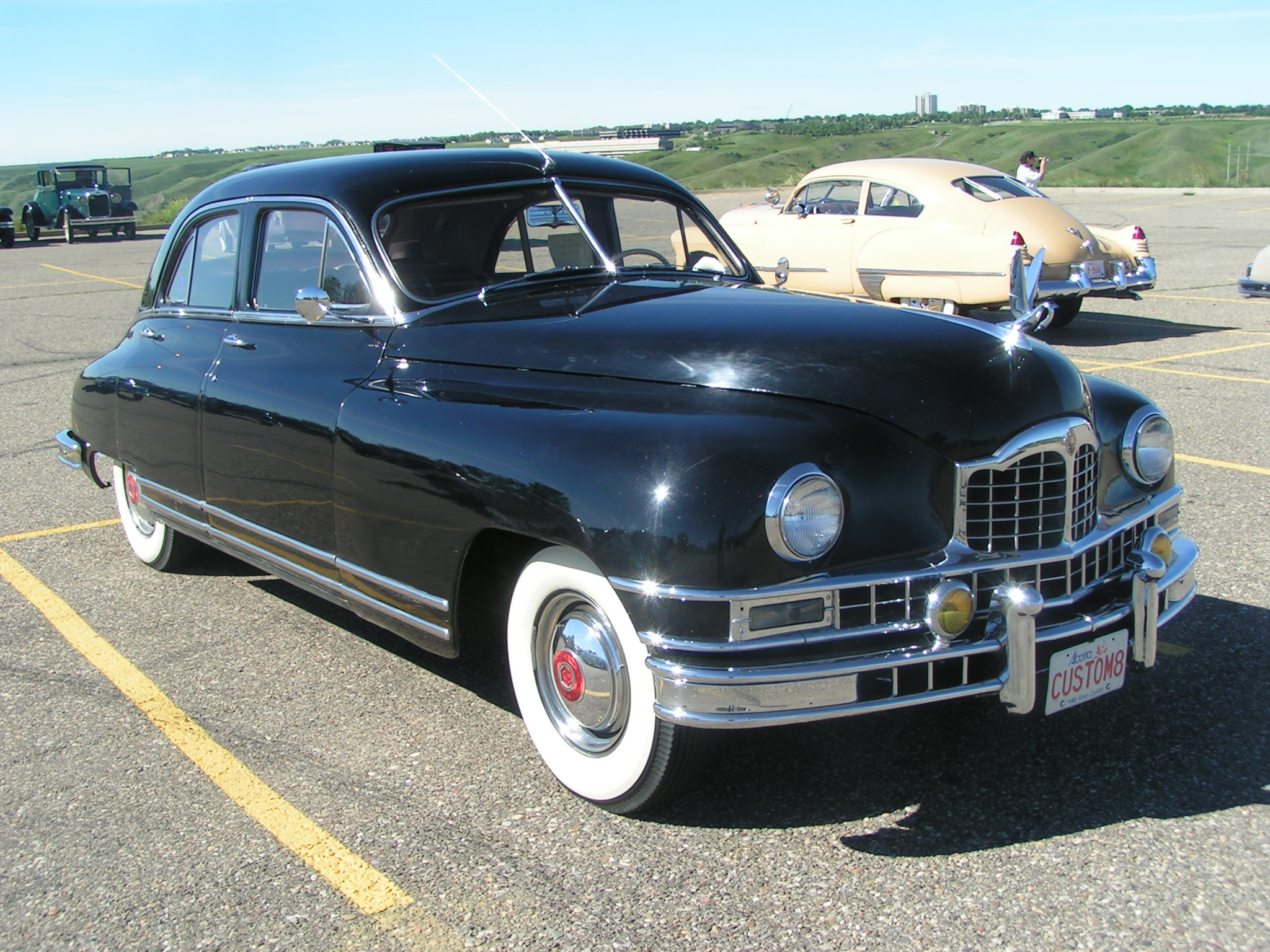
1948 Packard Custom Super Eight Series 2206

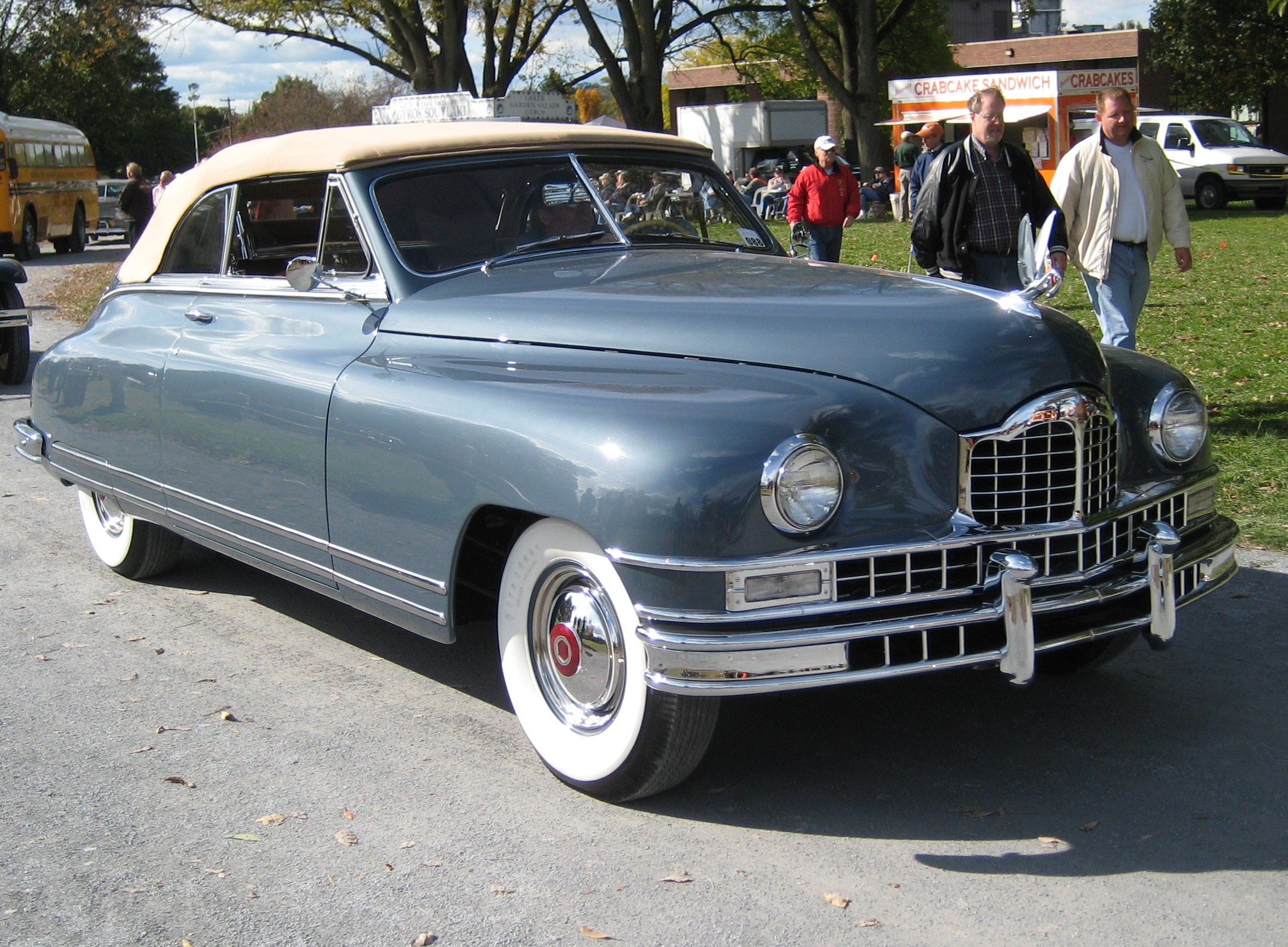
1948 Packard Custom Super Eight Victoria Convertible Series 2233

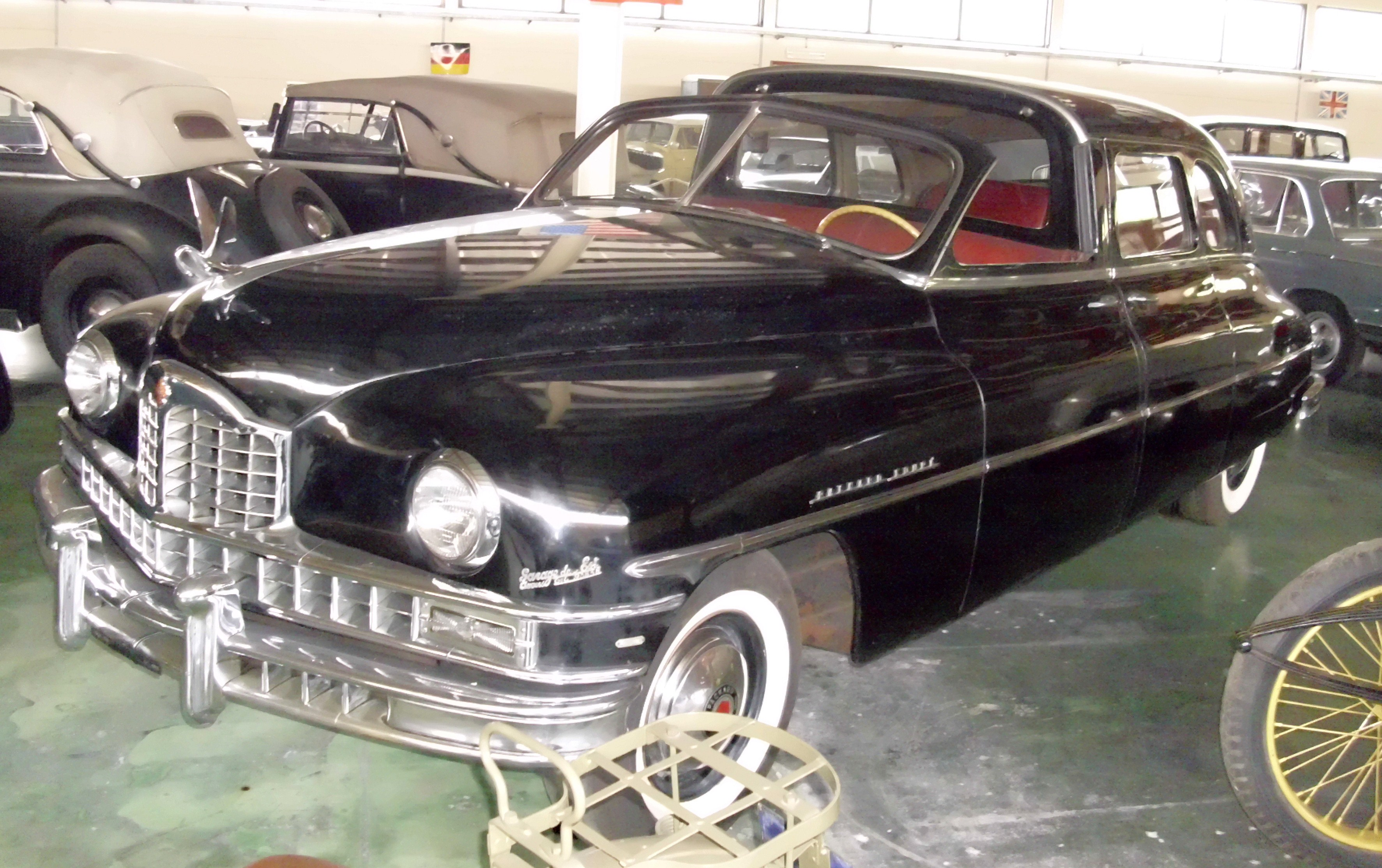
1949 Packard Custom Super Eight Derham Series 2322

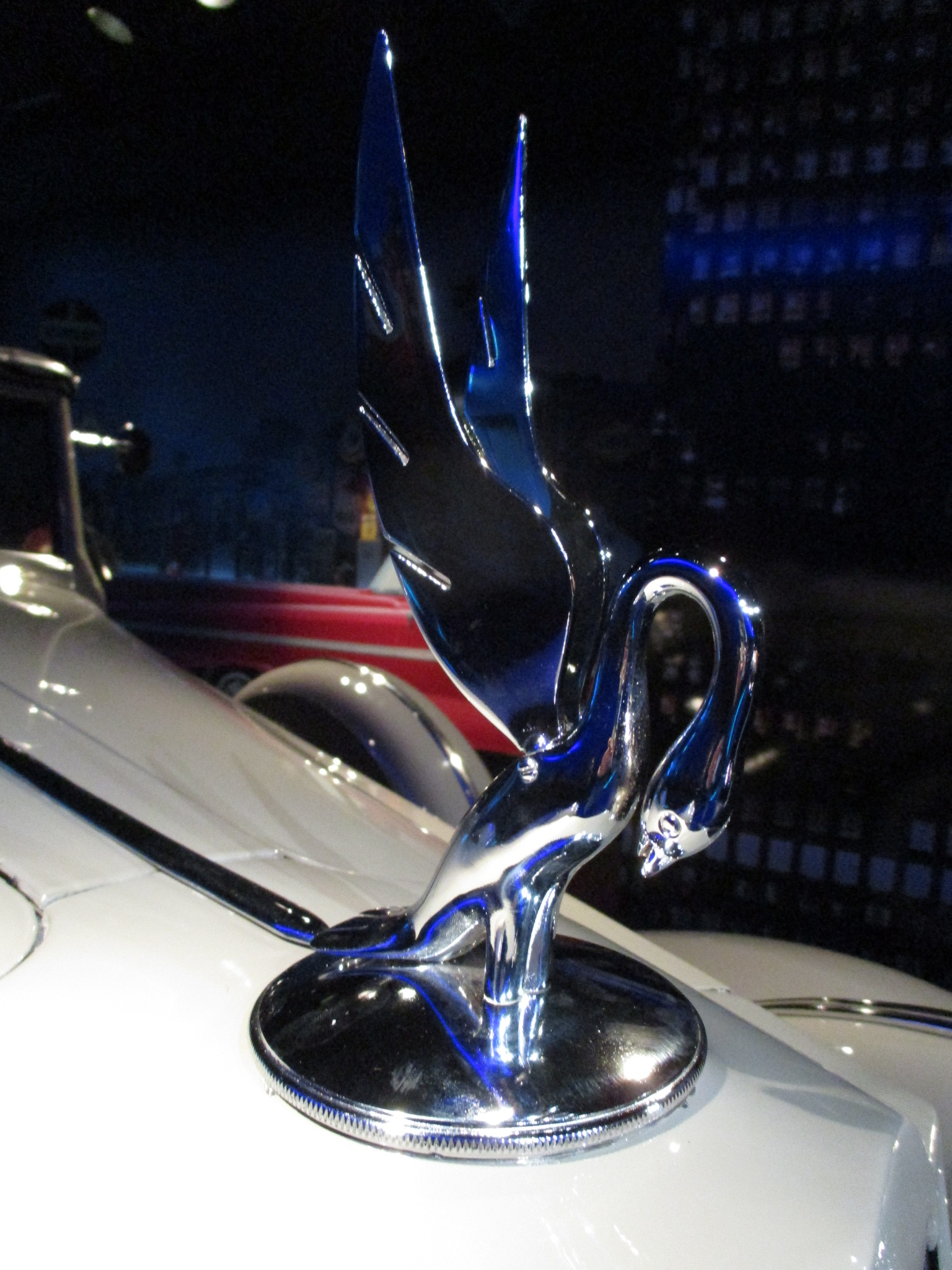
"Winged Goddess" cormorant hood ornament
