= Aduyev =

Aduyev (Russian: Адуев; masculine) or Aduyeva (Адуева; feminine) is a Russian last name. It is derived from the word "аду́й" (aduy), used to mock the inhabitants of Odoyevsky Uyezd in Tula Governorate.

Fictional characters

- Alexander Aduyev, main hero of A Common Story, a debut novel by Ivan Goncharov
- Uzhakh Aduyev, character played by Alexey Serebryakov in the 2003 Russian movie Antikiller 2: Antiterror

Toponyms

- Aduyeva, alternative name of Aduyevo, a village in Yermolinskoye Rural Settlement of Istrinsky District in Moscow Oblast; 55°57′N 36°58′E

== See also ==
- Aduyevo, several rural localities in Russia
