= ZIS-115 =

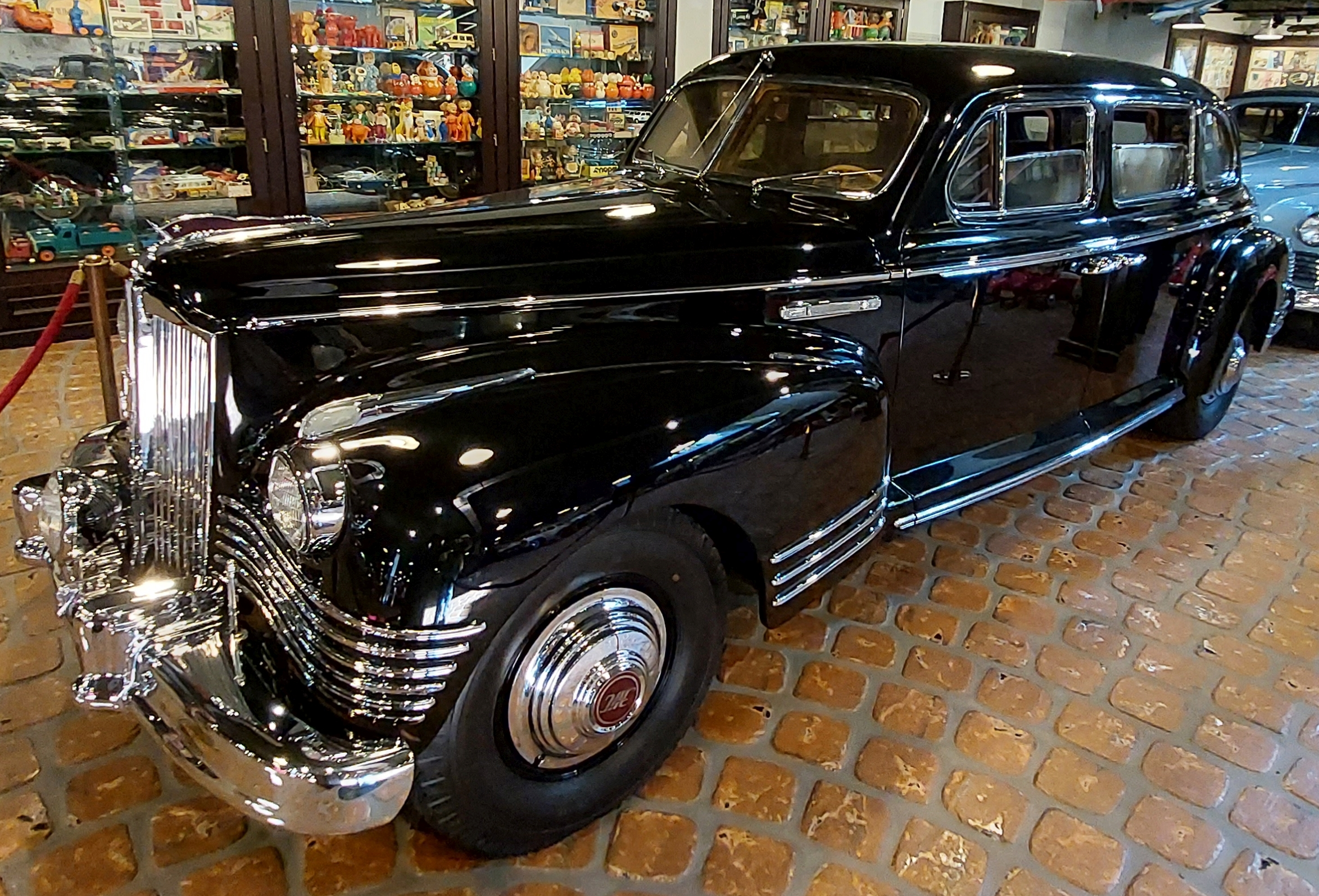

Overview
- Manufacturer: ZIS
- Production: 1948–1949; 32 built
- Assembly: Soviet Union: Moscow (Likhachov Plant)

Body and chassis
- Class: Armored limousine
- Body style: 4-door saloon
- Layout: FR layout
- Related: ZIS-110

Powertrain
- Engine: 6.0 L ZIS-115 I8
- Transmission: 3-speed manual

Dimensions
- Wheelbase: 3,760 mm (148.0 in)
- Length: 6,000 mm (236.2 in)
- Width: 1,960 mm (77.2 in)
- Height: 1,730 mm (68.1 in)
- Curb weight: 4,200 kg (9,259 lb)

The ZIS-115 is a Soviet-built, armored version of the ZIS-110 limousine, designed and built especially for Joseph Stalin. A total of 32 of the cars were manufactured between 1948 and 1949. The heavily armored car's design was based on the American 1942 Packard Super Eight. The car weighed over 4 tonnes, with windows made of glass nearly 8 cm (3 in) thick (each of which weighed over 200 kg [440 lb]) were powered by a hydraulic system. Its 6.0-litre (366 cu in) straight-eight engine generated 140 hp (103 kW) with a top speed of 121 km/h (75 mph).

Stalin, wary of assassination, always rode in the rear of the car, seated between two armed bodyguards. He frequently changed the route driven from his home in Kuntsevo to the Kremlin. Usage of this vehicle was seen in other countries, as Stalin donated a ZIS-115 to Chairman Mao Zedong due to the lack of armored Chinese vehicles suitable for the purpose of transporting high-ranking officials. After Stalin's death in 1953, the armored ZIS limousines continued to be used for many years by successive Soviet leaders. In 1955, Nikita Khrushchev donated two of these vehicles (which are on display in the Slovenian museum Bistra) to Yugoslav president Josip Broz Tito.

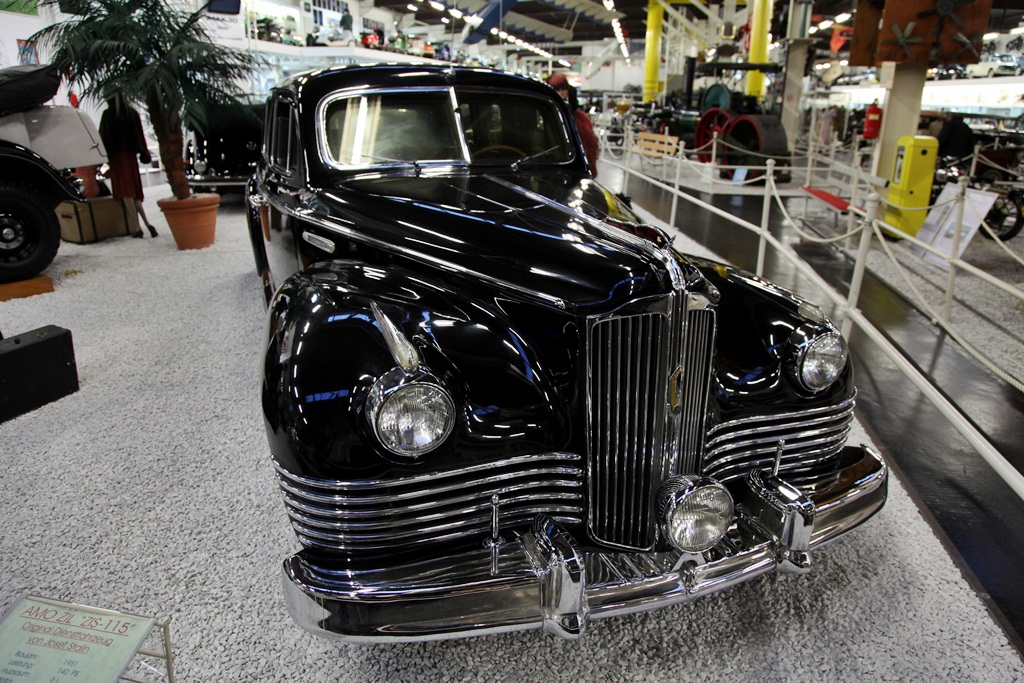
Stalin's ZIS-115 at the Technikmuseum Sinsheim

Several ZIS-115's still exist in private collections and museums around the world. Russian leaders continued to occasionally use the cars as late as 1994.
