= Power window =

Feature of a motor vehicle

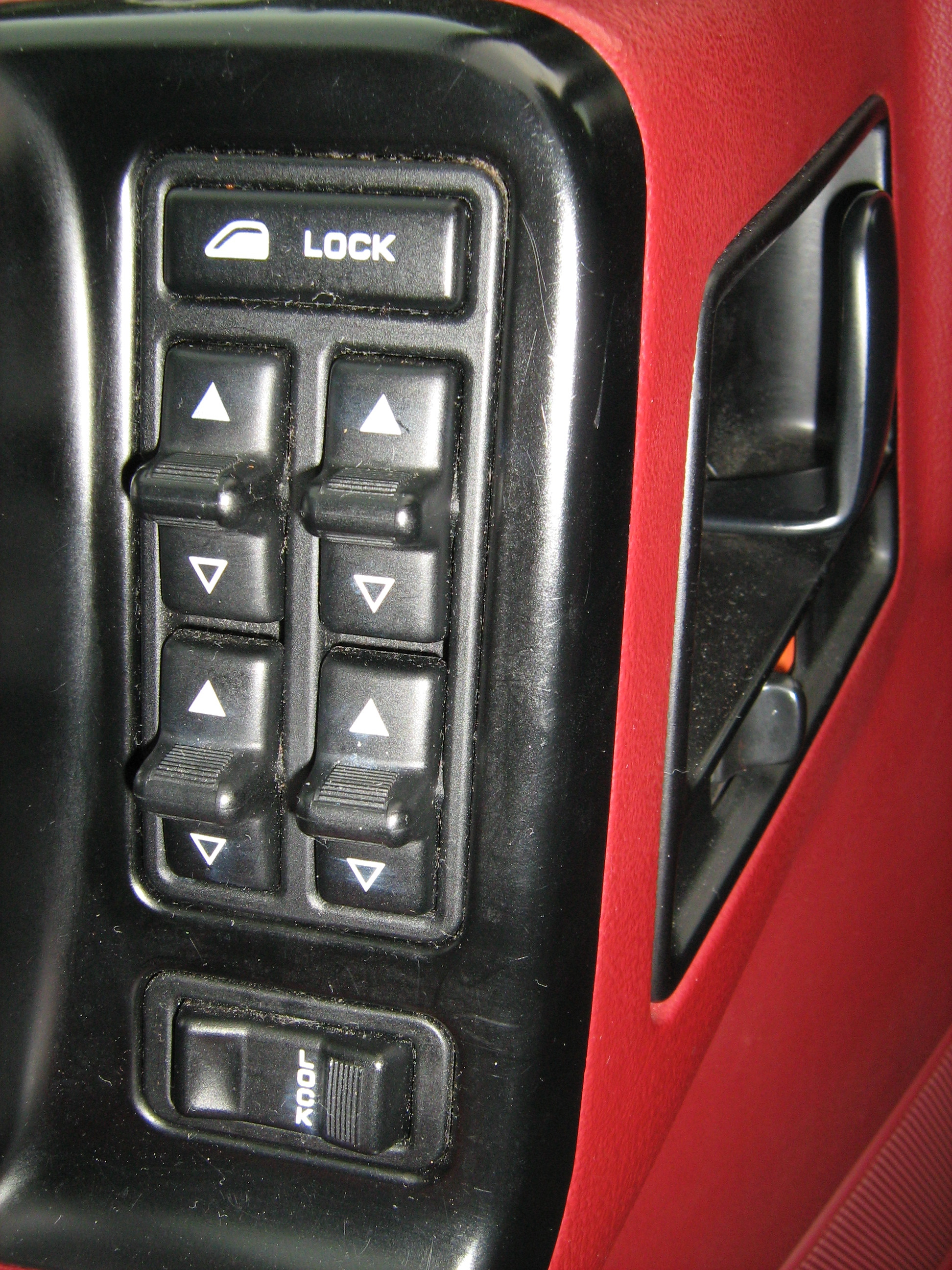
Typical window switches with remote disable control on driver's door (1993 Jeep Grand Cherokee)

Power windows or electric windows are automobile windows which can be raised and lowered by pressing a button or switch, as opposed to using a crank handle.

== History ==
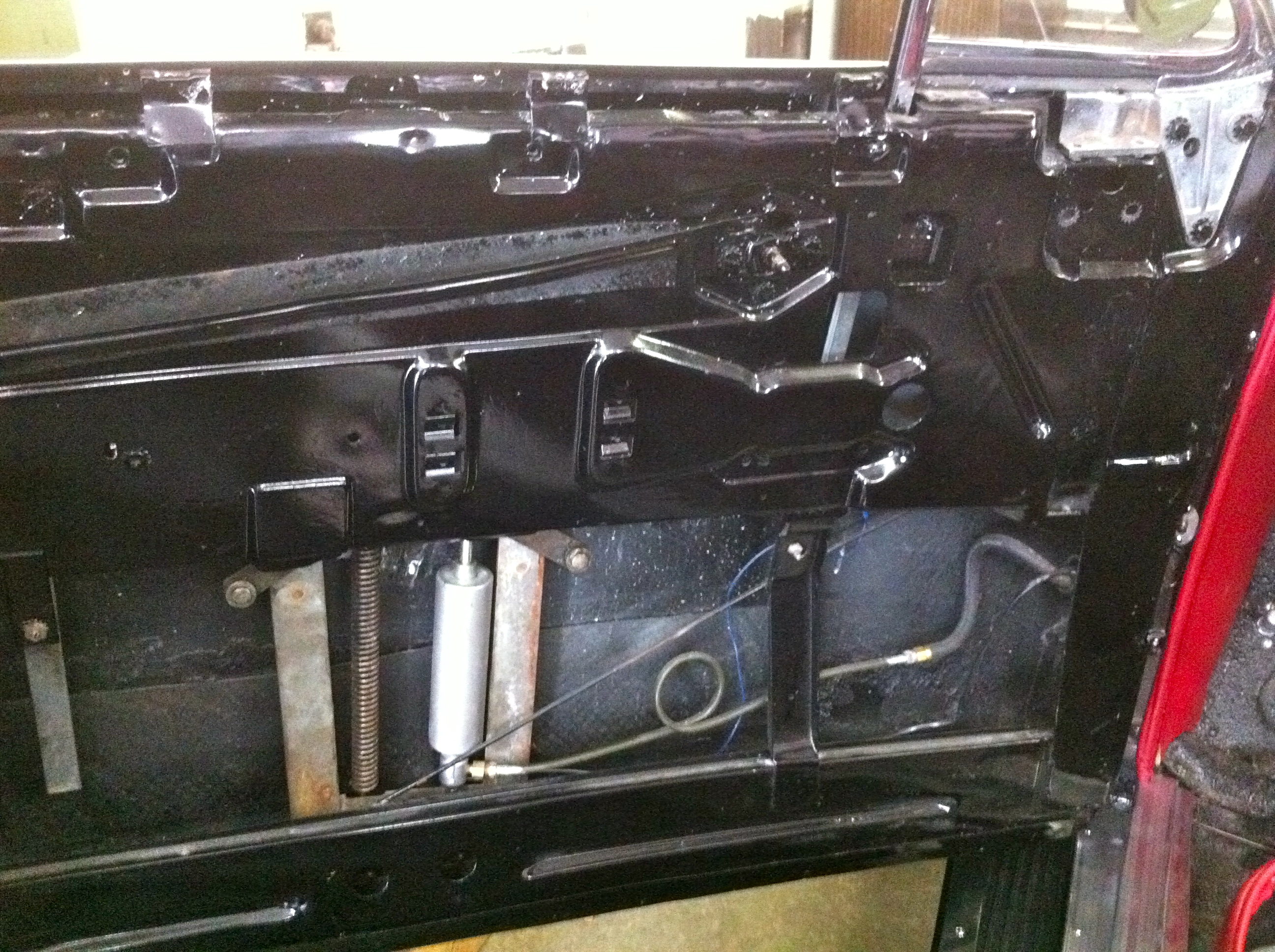
Inside driver's door showing hydraulic cylinder for power window

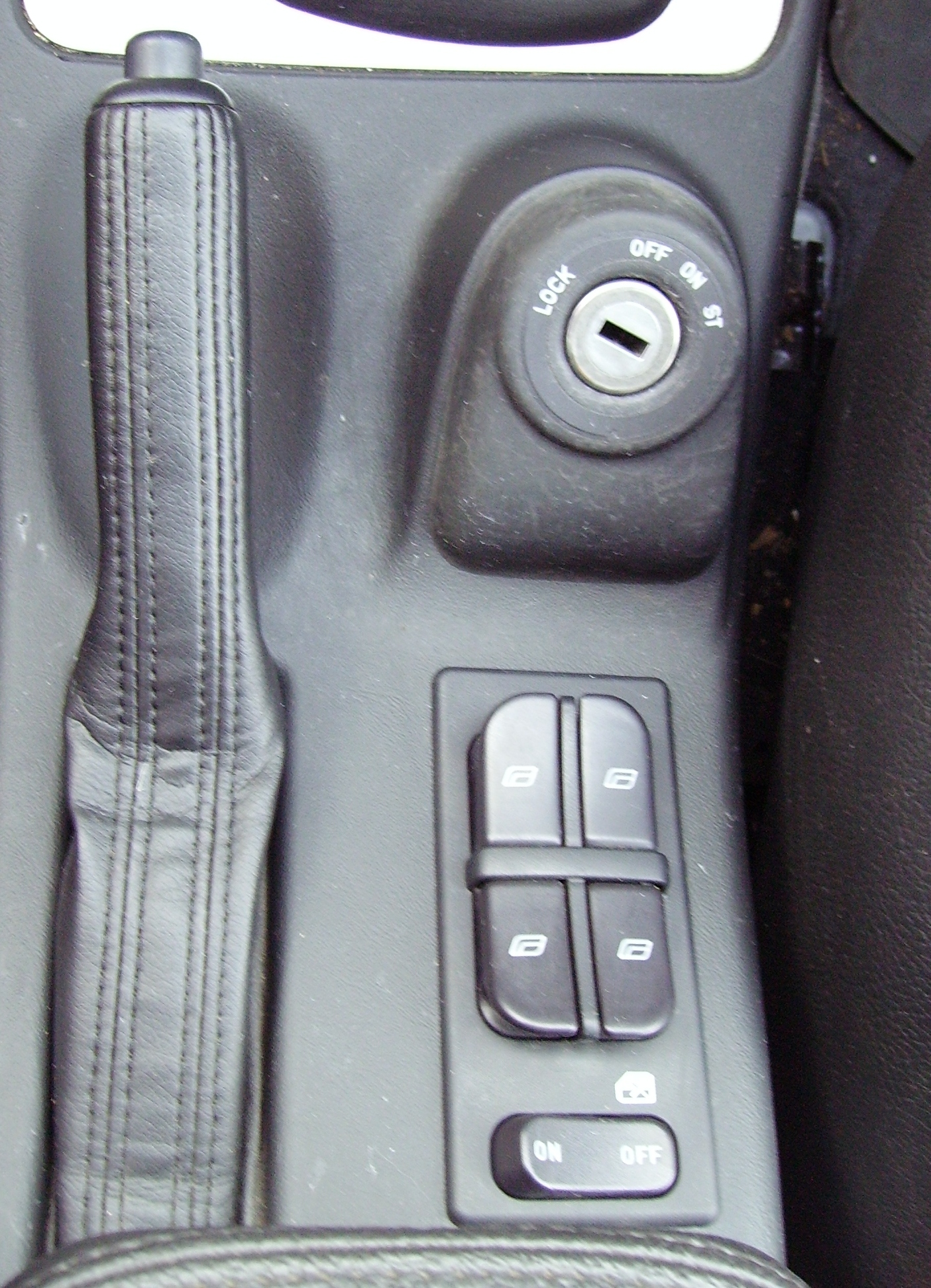
Window controls on center console between front seats (2005 Saab 9-5)

A small number of cars in the 1920s, such as the 1925 Flint Model E-55, featured an early form of "automatic windows" which used a fully mechanical, spring loaded system to raise the windows. Packard introduced hydraulic window lifts (power windows) in fall of 1940, for its new 1941 Packard 180 series cars. This was a hydraulic-electric system, called "Hydro-Electric" by Packard. In 1941, the Ford Motor Company followed with the first power windows on the Lincoln Custom (only the limousine and seven-passenger sedans). Cadillac had a straight-electric divider window (but not side windows) on their series 75.

Power assists originated in the need and desire to move convertible body-style tops up and down by some means other than human effort. The earliest power assists were vacuum-operated and were offered on Chrysler Corporation vehicles, particularly the low-cost Plymouth convertibles in the late 1930s.

Shortly before World War II, General Motors developed a central hydraulic pump for working convertible tops. This system was introduced on 1942 convertibles built by GM. Previously, GM had used a vacuum system which did not have the power to handle increasingly larger and complex (four side-windows vs. only two) convertible top mechanisms.

Chief Engineer of the Buick Division, Charles A. Chayne, "...had introduced an electrically controlled hydraulic system into the 1946 Buick convertibles that provided fingertip operation of the top, door windows, and front seat adjustment". These systems were based on major hydraulic advances made in military weapons in preparation for World War II.

The "Hydro-Electric" system (windows, front seat adjustment and convertible top) was standard on 1947 model year. The seat and window assist system became available on GM closed cars (standard on some Cadillac Series 75 models and all Series 60 Specials, commonly called "Fleetwood" beginning with the 1948). The full system was standard only on the high-end GM convertibles made by Oldsmobile, Buick, and Cadillac. It was only available as a package; that is, power assisted windows, front seat, and convertible top (where applicable). This feature can be identified in 1948 and later General Motors model numbers with an "X" at the end, such as the 1951 Cadillac Sixty Special sedan, model 6019X. The electrically operated hydraulic pump system was shared by Hudson and Packard for their 1948 through 1950 models. The driver's door contained four buttons in addition to the remaining individual windows.

Ford also had a similar electro-hydraulic system on higher-end convertibles. Mercury and Ford Sportsman convertibles (with wood trim) were equipped with power windows on four windows from 1946 through 1948 and Mercury and Lincoln by 1951. These systems were used by other luxury car models (Imperial and Packard) until Chrysler introduced the all-electric operation on the 1951 Imperial. The availability of power windows increased with the use of small, high-torque electric motors. General Motors also followed with full electric operation in 1954. This included four-way and then six-way seats, which were introduced in 1956. Chevrolet introduced the oddity of power front windows (only) in the 1954 model. Ford also introduced full four-door power windows in sedans in 1954. The full-sized 1955 Nash "Airflyte" models featured optional power windows.

Electrically-operated vent windows were available as early as 1956 on the Continental Mark II. The 1960s Cadillac Fleetwood came standard with power front and rear vent windows, in addition to standard power side windows, for a total of eight power window controls on the driver's door panel.

Modern heavy-duty highway tractors frequently have an option for power window controls; however, these are generally what is referred to as "straight air". That is, the compressed air system used for air brakes is also used for the windows. These types of trucks have long used compressed air cylinders for seat height adjustment. In a similar fashion to the electro-hydraulic system, the compressed air is merely released to lower the window and/or seat. The compressed air is then admitted to the respective cylinder to raise the window or seat.

In a typical auto/light truck installation, there is an individual switch at each window and a set of switches in the driver's door or a-frame pillar, so the driver can operate all the windows. These switches took on many different appearances, from heavy chrome plate to inexpensive plastic.

However, some manufacturers like Saab, Volvo, Mazda, Opel/Vauxhall and Holden have used switches located in the center console, where they are accessible to all the occupants. In this case, the door-mounted switches can be omitted. This also removes the need to produce separate door components and wiring for left and right-hand drive variants.

== Operation ==
Power windows are usually inoperable when the car is not running, which is a security feature to prevent it from being stolen. Some systems offer the compromise of leaving power applied to the windows until a passenger door is opened at which time the window power is removed.

Hydraulic drive systems could lower the windows at rest, since pressure from the hydraulic system was merely released to lower the window. Raising the windows required an electrically operated pump to operate and introduce pressure at the appropriate cylinder. These systems also required pressure lines to each cylinder (in the doors, as well as on certain cars, to the power seat and a power operated convertible top). Because of the complexity, the system could also leak fluid.

Many modern cars have a time delay feature, first introduced by Cadillac in the 1980s, called "retained accessory power". This allows operation of the windows and some other accessories for ten minutes or so after the engine is stopped. Another feature is the "express-down" window, which allows the window to be fully lowered with one tap on the switch, as opposed to holding the switch down until the window retracts. Many luxury vehicles during the 1990s expanded on this feature, to include "express-up" on the driver's window, and recently, some manufacturers have added the feature on all window switches for all passengers' convenience. This is done by activating the switch until a "click" response is felt.

Power windows have become so common that by 2008, some automakers eliminated hand crank windows from all their models. So many vehicles now have power windows that some people no longer understand the (formerly) common sign from another driver of using their hand to simulate moving a window crank to indicate that they wish to speak with someone when stopped at a light or in a parking lot. The 2008 Audi RS4 sold in Europe, however, still has roll-up windows for the rear doors although its counterpart sold in the U.S. has power windows for all doors.

== Safety ==
Power windows have come under some scrutiny after several fatal accidents in which children's necks have become trapped, leading to suffocation. Some designs place the switch in a location on a hand rest where it can be accidentally triggered by a child climbing to place his or her head out of the window. To prevent this, many vehicles feature a driver-controlled lockout switch, preventing rear-seat passengers (usually smaller children) from accidentally triggering the switches. This also prevents children from playing with them and pets riding with their heads out windows from activating the power window switch.

A power window lockout switch is a popular convenience that allows the driver to prevent passengers, usually children, from using the windows. Many cars have a feature called "courtesy power on" which allows the windows to remain operational for a brief period after the key is taken out of the ignition, so that adjustments can be made without putting the key back in. Additionally, some vehicles offer the option to operate the windows from outside the car using a remote.

Starting with the 2008 model year, U.S. government regulations required automakers to install safety mechanisms to improve child safety. However, the rules do not prevent all potential injuries to a hand, finger, or even a child's head, if someone deliberately holds the switch when the window is closing. In 2009, the U.S. auto safety administration tentatively decided against requiring all cars to have automatic reversing power windows if they sense an obstruction while closing. Proposed requirements concern automatic ("one-touch up") window systems, but most vehicles with this feature already have automatic-reversing. The federal government made a written contract that all automakers should make the lever switches (as opposed to the rocker and toggle switches) standard on all new vehicles by 1 October 2010.
