= Medyn =

Medyn Медынь
- Town
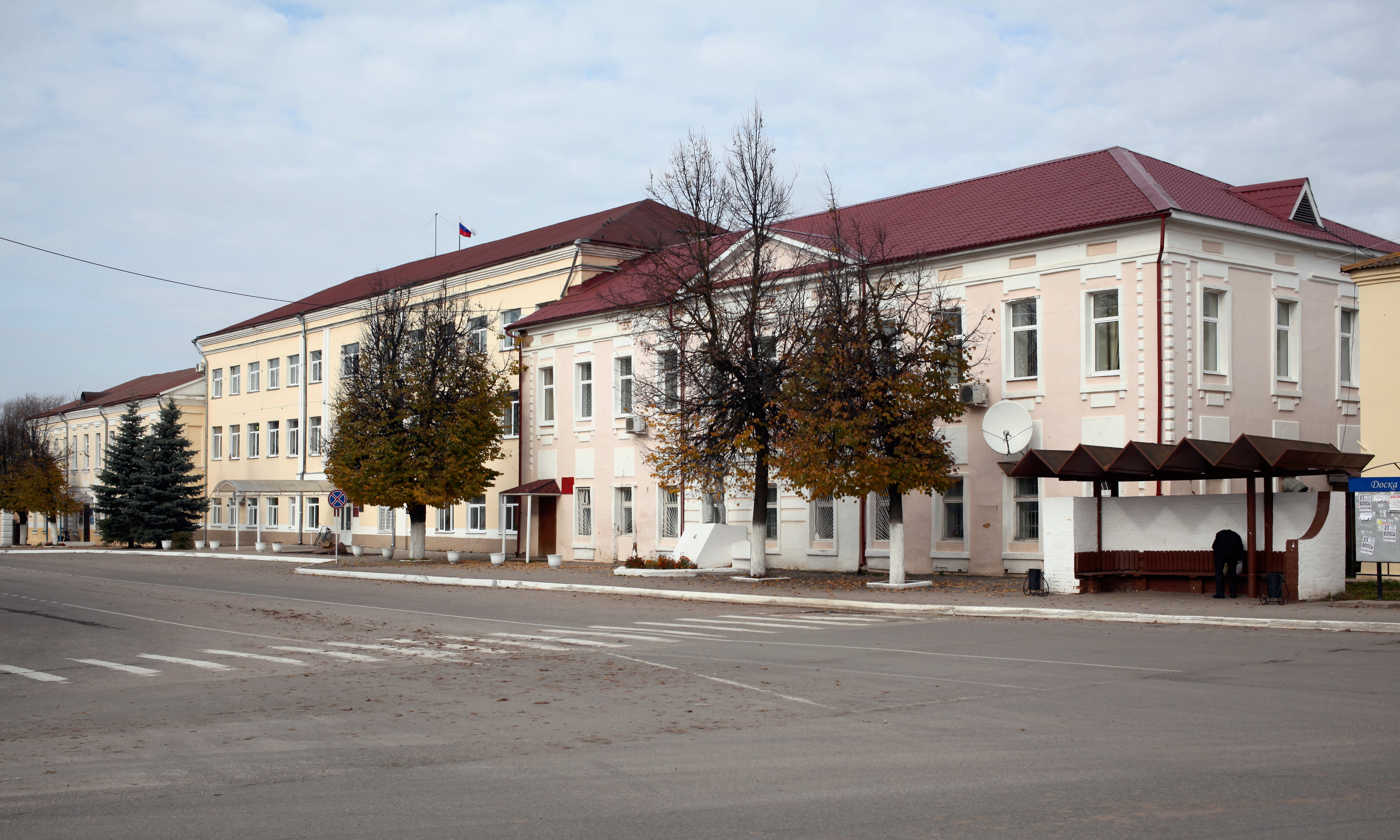
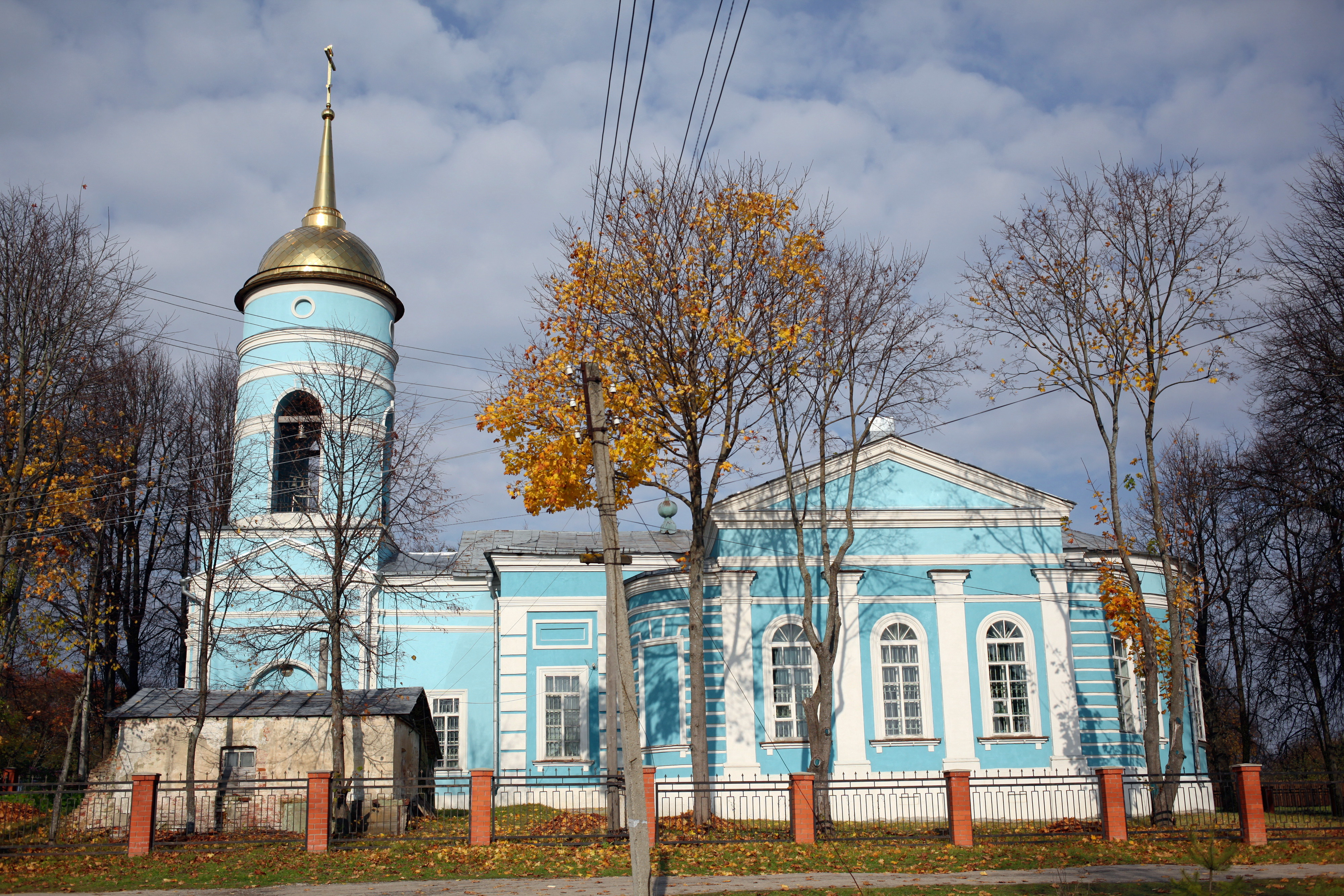
- Lunačarskogo street Kazanskaja church Lenina Avenue in Medyn

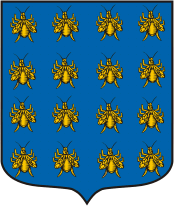
- Coat of arms
- Interactive map of Medyn
- Location of Medyn Medyn (Europe) Medyn (Russia)
- Coordinates: 54°58′N 35°52′E
- Country: Russia
- Federal subject: Kaluga Oblast
- Administrative district: Medynsky District
- First mentioned: 1386
- Town status since: 1776

Population (2010 Census)
  - Total: 8,300
  - Estimate (2023): 8,042 (−3.1%)

Administrative status
  - Capital of: Medynsky District

Municipal status
  - Municipal district: Medynsky Municipal District
  - Urban settlement: Medyn Urban Settlement
  - Capital of: Medynsky Municipal District, Medyn Urban Settlement
- Time zone: UTC+3 (MSK)
- Postal codes: 249950, 249951
- OKTMO ID: 29625101001

Medyn (Russian: Меды́нь) is a town and the administrative center of Medynsky District in Kaluga Oblast, Russia, located on the Medynka River (Oka basin), 60 kilometers (37 mi) northwest of Kaluga, the administrative center of the oblast. Population: 8,200 (2021 census); 8,300 (2010 census); 7,940 (2002 census); 8,364 (1989 Soviet census).

== History ==
It was first mentioned in 1386, when it passed from the Principality of Smolensk to the Grand Duchy of Moscow. The village of Medynskoye was granted town status in 1776.

== Administrative and municipal status ==
Within the framework of administrative divisions, Medyn serves as the administrative center of Medynsky District, to which it is directly subordinated. As a municipal division, the town of Medyn is incorporated within Medynsky Municipal District as Medyn Urban Settlement.

== Military ==
The now-defunct airbase Medyn-Aduyevo is situated 9 kilometers (5.6 mi) northeast of Medyn.
