= Medynsky District =

Medynsky District Медынский район (Russian)
- District
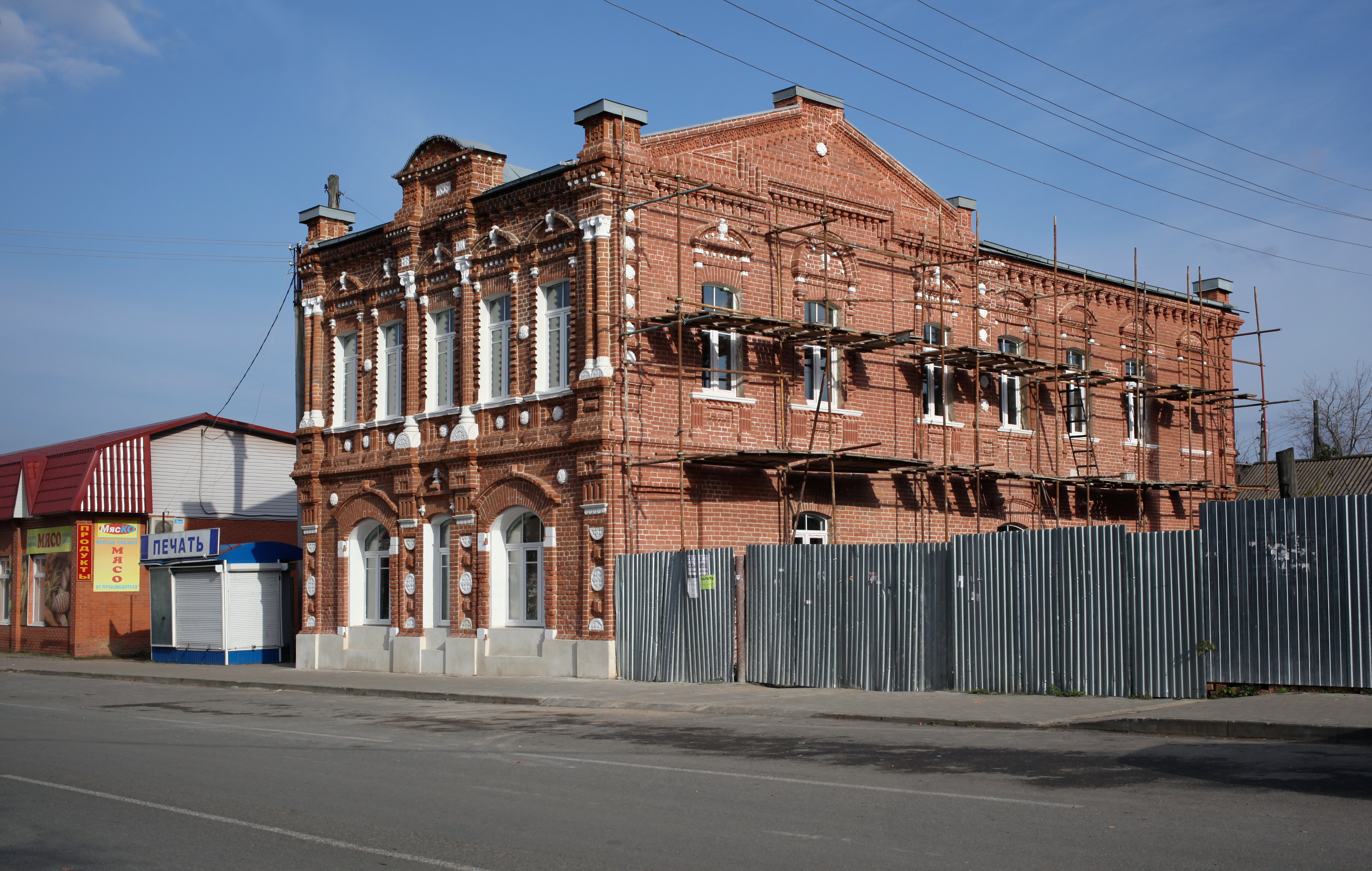
- Zhuravlev House in Medyn, Medynsky District

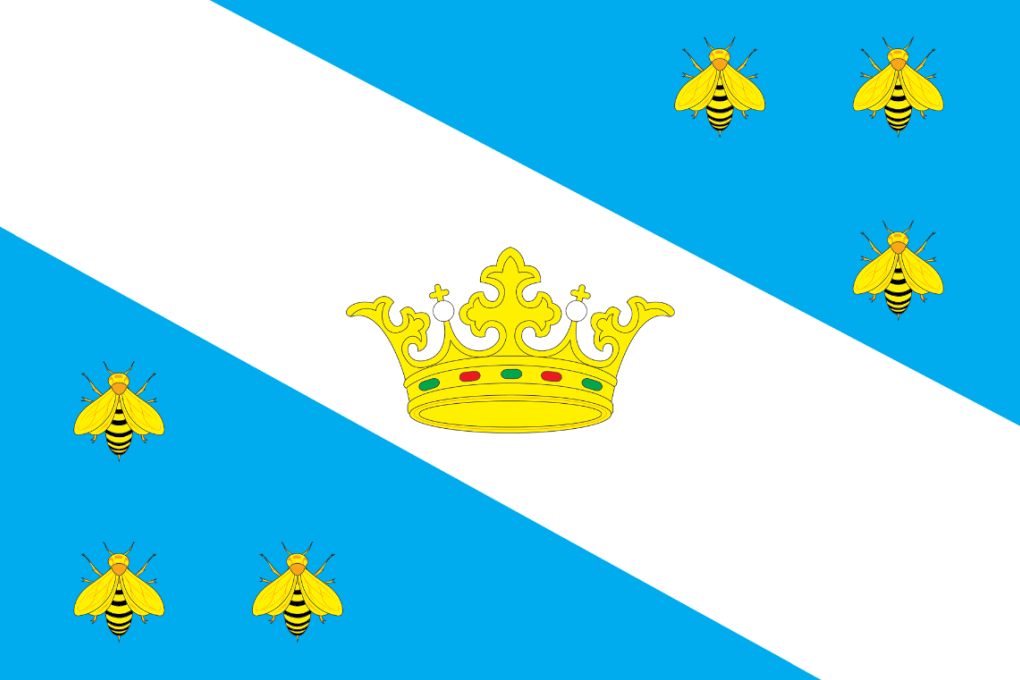
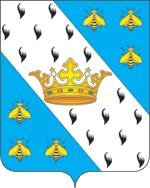
- Flag Coat of arms
- Location of Medynsky District in Kaluga Oblast
- Coordinates: 54°58′N 35°52′E
- Country: Russia
- Federal subject: Kaluga Oblast
- Established: 1 October 1929
- Administrative center: Medyn

Area
  - Total: 1,148 km^{2} (443 sq mi)

Population (2010 Census)
  - Total: 13,347
  - Density: 11.63/km^{2} (30.11/sq mi)
  - Urban: 62.2%
  - Rural: 37.8%

Administrative structure
  - Inhabited localities: 1 cities/towns, 132 rural localities

Municipal structure
  - Municipally incorporated as: Medynsky Municipal District
  - Municipal divisions: 1 urban settlements, 11 rural settlements
- Time zone: UTC+3 (MSK)
- OKTMO ID: 29625000
- Website: http://www.medyn.ru/

Medynsky District (Russian: Медынский райо́н) is an administrative and municipal district (raion), one of the twenty-four in Kaluga Oblast, Russia. It is located in the north of the oblast. The area of the district is 1,148 square kilometers (443 sq mi). Its administrative center is the town of Medyn. Population: 12,493 (2021 census); 13,347 (2010 census); 13,783 (2002 Census); 14,655 (1989 Soviet census). The population of Medyn accounts for 65.6% of the district's total population.
