= Medyn-Aduyevo (air base) =

- IATA: none; ICAO: XUBG

Summary
- Airport type: Abandoned
- Operator: Soviet Air Force
- Location: Kaluga
- Elevation AMSL: 636 ft / 194 m
- Coordinates: 55°0′12″N 035°59′42″E
- Interactive map of Medyn-Aduyevo

Runways
Direction	Length		Surface
Direction	ft	m	Surface
	8,202	2,500

Medyn-Aduyevo was a Soviet Air Force base in Kaluga Oblast, Russia located 56 km northwest of Kaluga. It was a 1960s-era airbase, situated 9 km northeast of the town of Medyn.

By the 1980s or 1990s the airfield had been completely plowed over into pasture. A Degree Confluence Project intersection is along the former southern tarmac. Two confluence hunters did not see any remains or even suspect them, but visit photos clearly show wide clearings and revetments grown over by vegetation.

A portion of the airfield is owned by Vadim Zadorozhny with plans to build a build an expansion of his museum at the site.
