= Packard Super Eight =

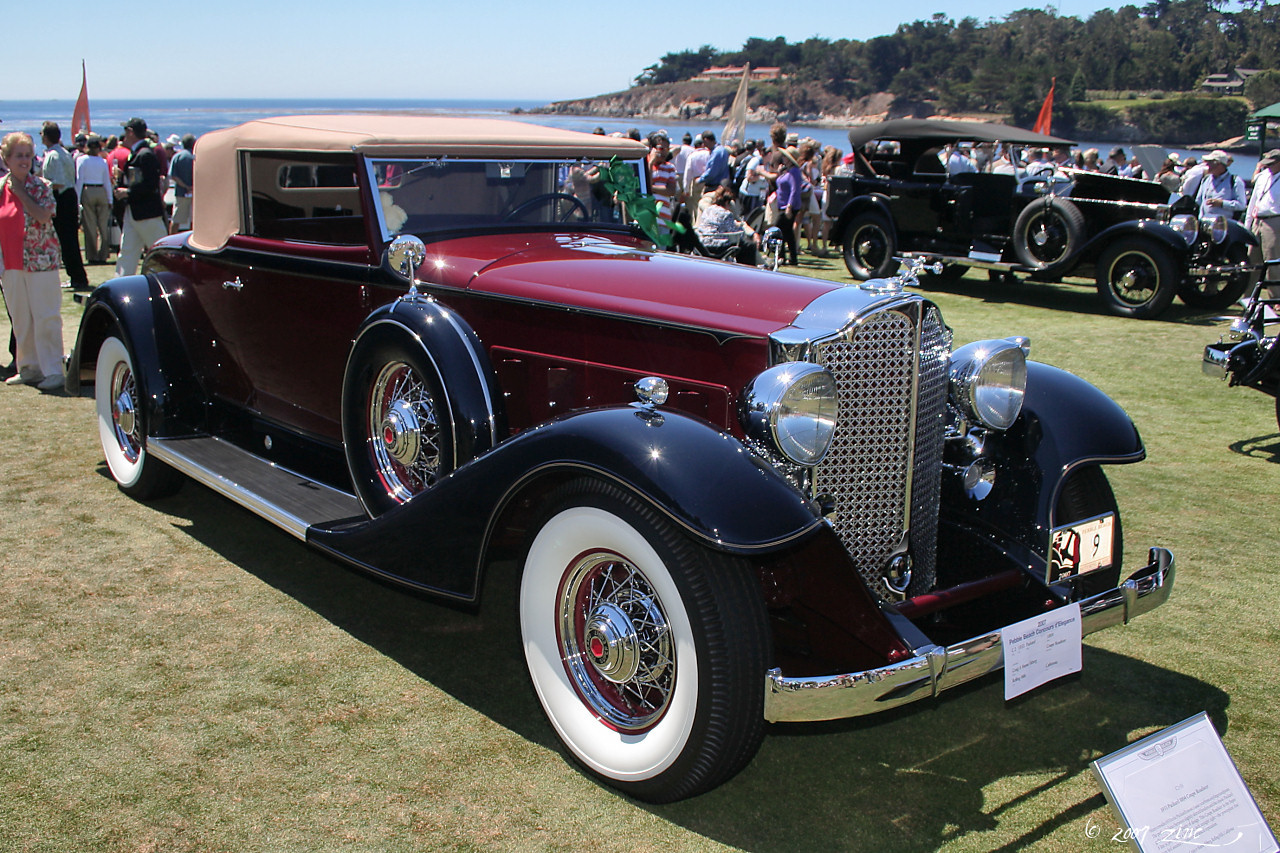
- 1933 Packard 1004 Super Eight Coupe Roadster

Overview
- Manufacturer: Packard
- Production: 1933–1951
- Assembly: Packard Automotive Plant, Detroit, Michigan, United States

Body and chassis
- Class: Luxury car
- Body style: 2-door coupé; 2-door convertible; 4-door sedan; 4-door station wagon
- Layout: Front-engine, rear-wheel-drive
- Related: Packard Custom Super Eight; Packard Station Sedan; Packard Twelve

Powertrain
- Engine: 384.4 cu in (6.3 L) I8
- Transmission: 3-speed manual

Dimensions
- Wheelbase: 127 in (3,226 mm) (1939); 120 in (3,048 mm) (1946); 127 in (3,226 mm) (1949)
- Length: 208 in (5,283 mm) (1946)

Chronology
- Predecessor: Packard Eight
- Successor: Packard 300 / Cavalier

The Packard Super Eight was the larger of the two eight-cylinder luxury automobiles produced by the Packard Motor Car Company of Detroit, Michigan. It shared frames and some body types with the top model Packard Twelve. The 1933–1936 Packard Super Eight was a big classic. In 1937, it was reduced to a smaller and lighter design. Following the discontinuation of the Sixteenth Series Twelve after the 1939 model year, a new Custom Super Eight One-Eighty was derived from the Super Eight as the new top car range. The Super Eight was renamed the Super Eight One-Sixty starting a naming convention change in 1940. These two models shared most mechanical components including the 160 HP straight Eight engine and continued to be regarded as the Senior Packard.

After 1942, Packard concentrated on the new Clipper styling that was developed for an upper-class sedan the previous year. There were Super Clippers and Custom Super Clipper in the One-Sixty and One-Eighty tradition until 1947. After a heavy facelift, the name Clipper was dropped.

For 1948 the most senior Custom Super Eight One-Eighty became the Custom Super Eight, while its slightly lower-priced sibling, the Super Eight One-Sixty, once again became simply the Super Eight with the more modestly priced Eight with five body styles including the Packard Station Sedan. Clipper Custom Super Eights and Custom Eights were very close relatives to their respective Super models, distinguished outside by the lack of an eggcrate grille and small rear chrome trim moulding under the trunk lid on Supers. In 1949, a new Super Eight Deluxe was added to the line. This car had also the Custom Eight's eggcrate grille, but not the rear trim.

The entire range of Packard's motorcars was renamed for the 1951 model year (twenty-fourth series), when the Super Eight was renamed 300.

== Gallery ==
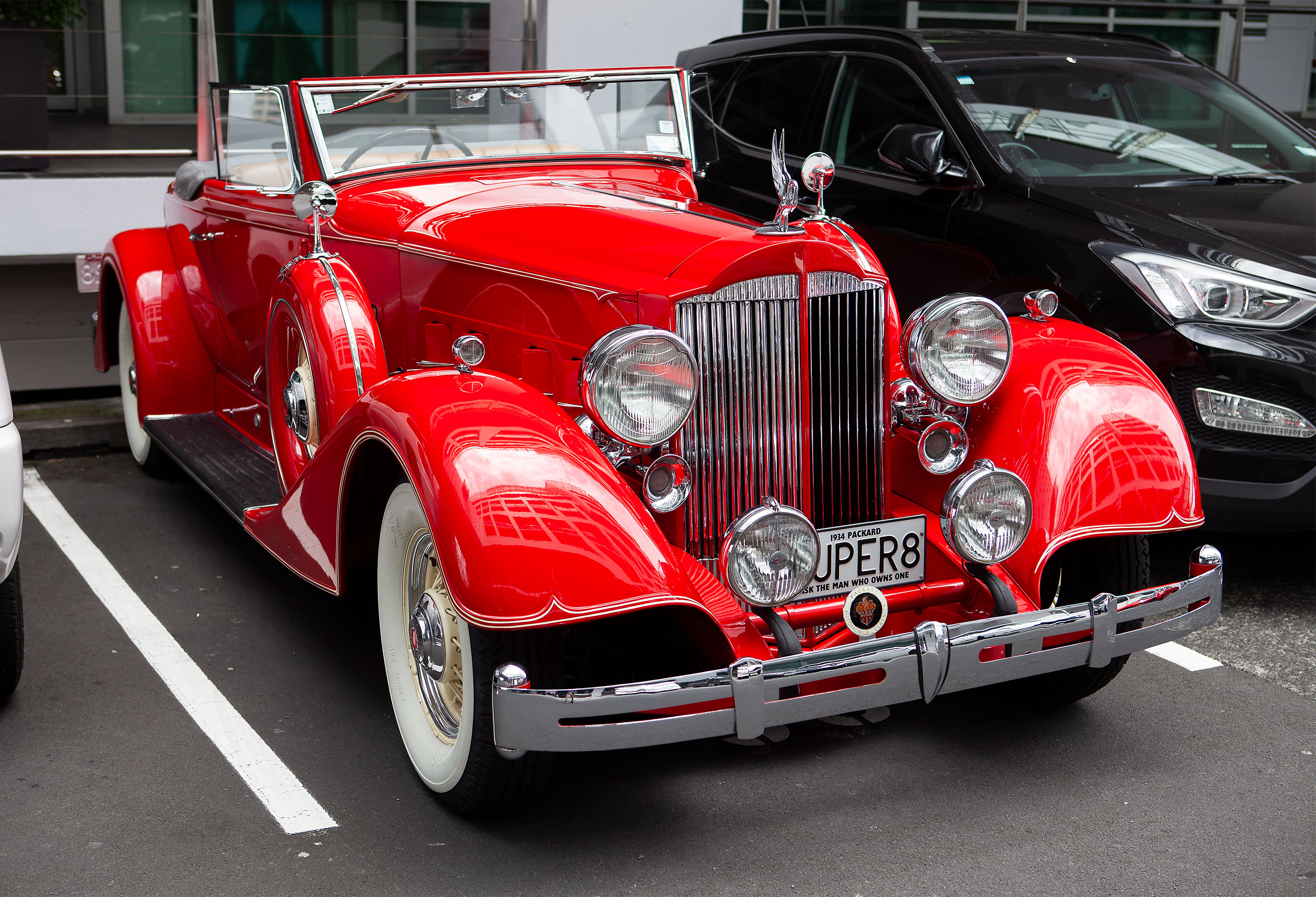
1934 Packard Super Eight Coupe Roadster (Model 1104)

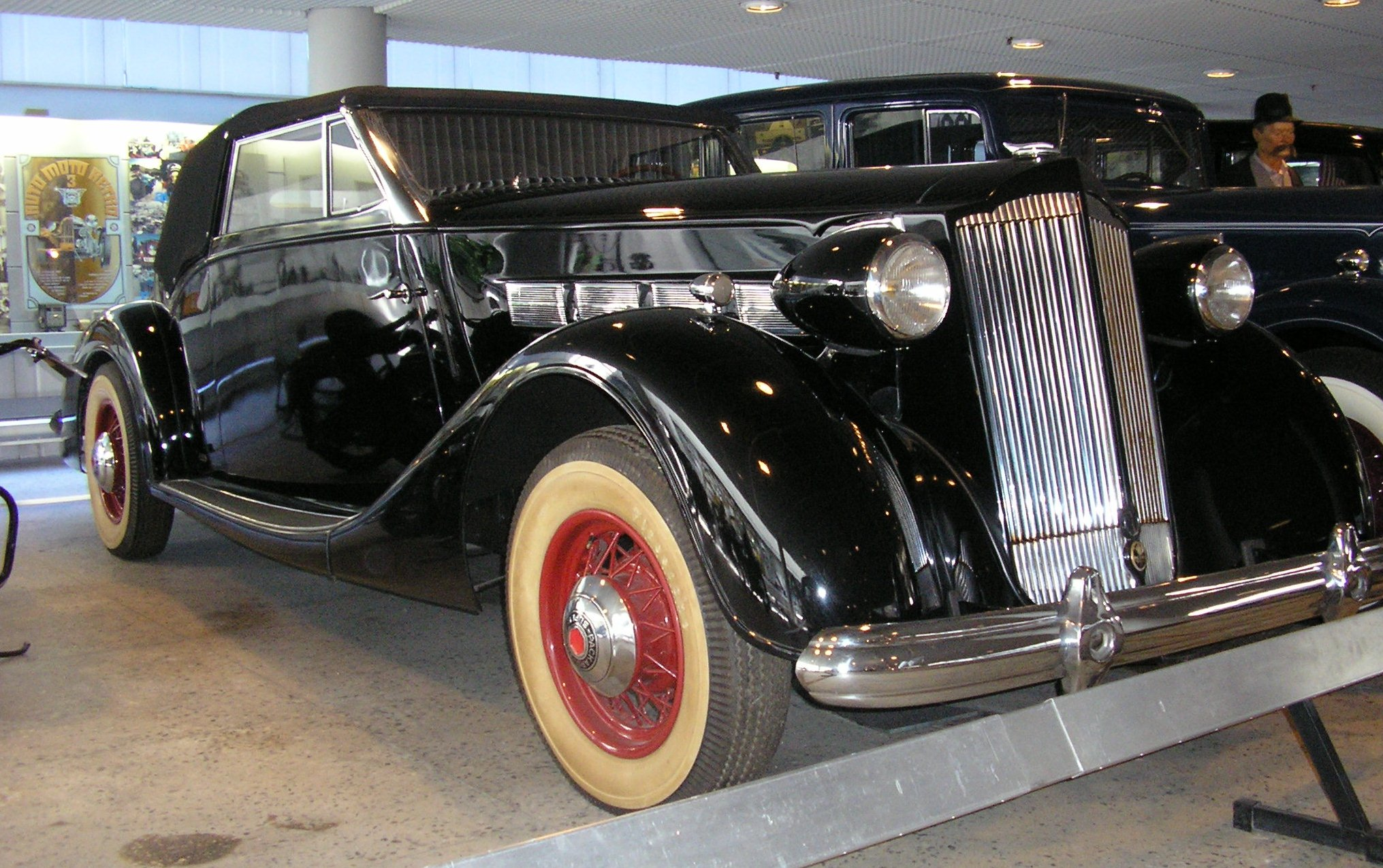
1937 Packard Super Eight Convertible Sedan (model 1502), formerly belonging to Carol II of Romania

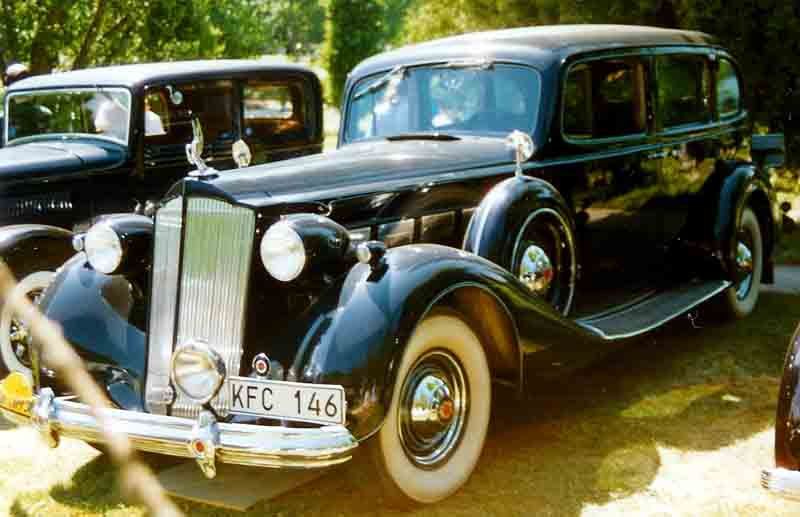
1937 Packard Super Eight Touring Limousine (model 1502)

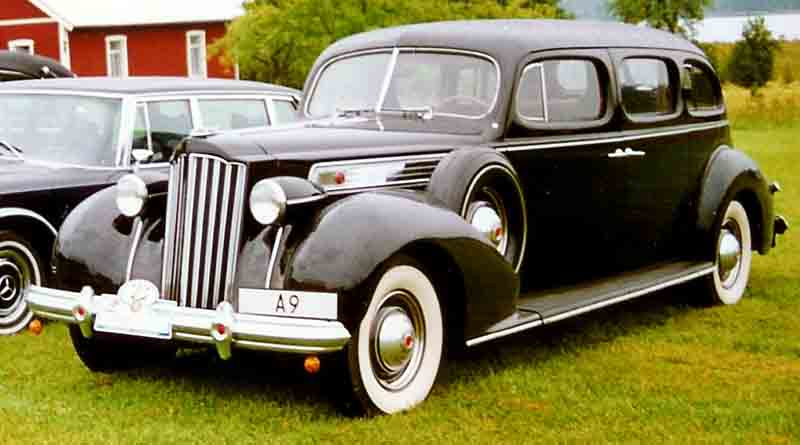
1939 Packard Super Eight Touring Limousine (model 1705)

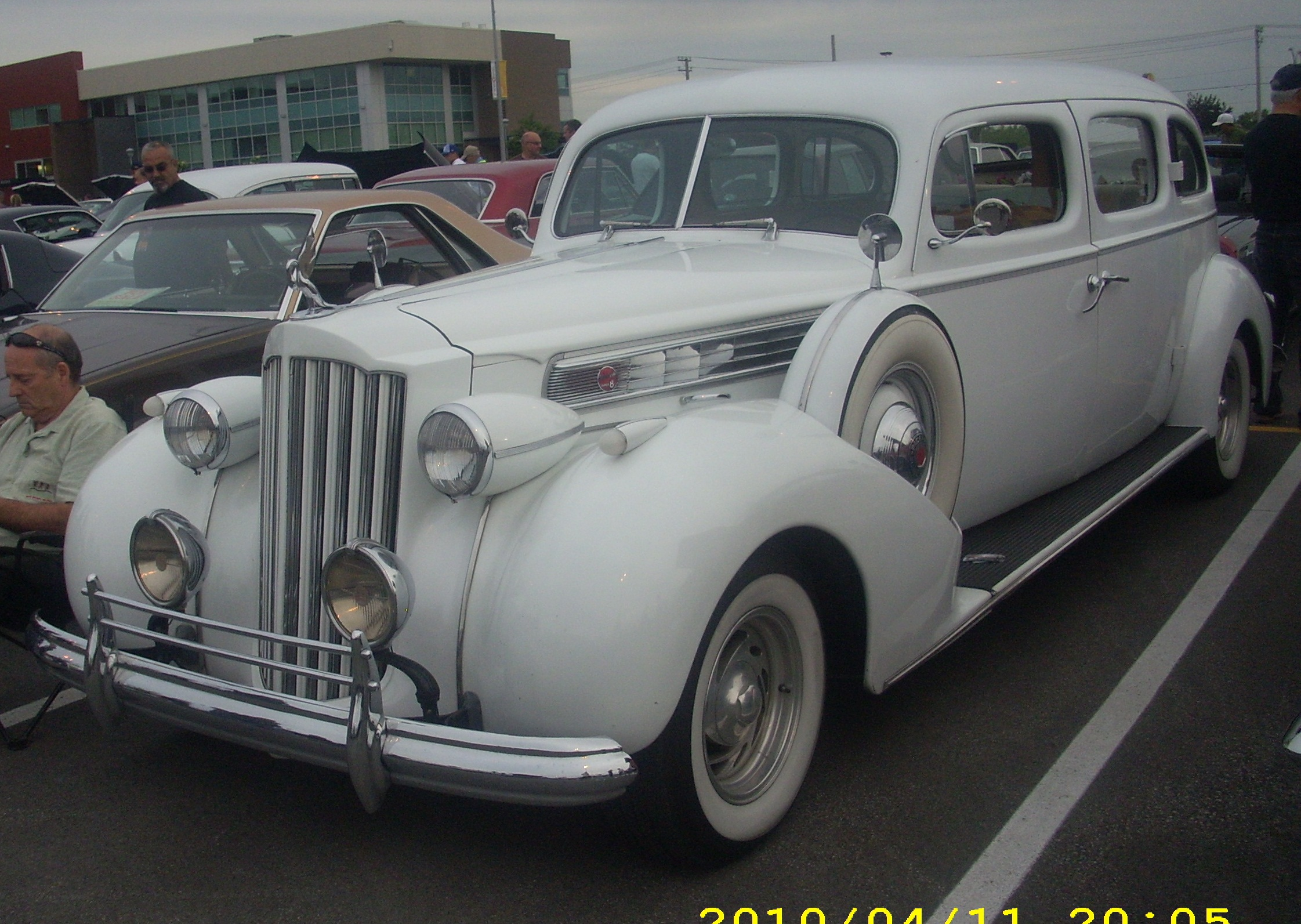
1939 Packard Super Eight Touring Limousine (model 1702)

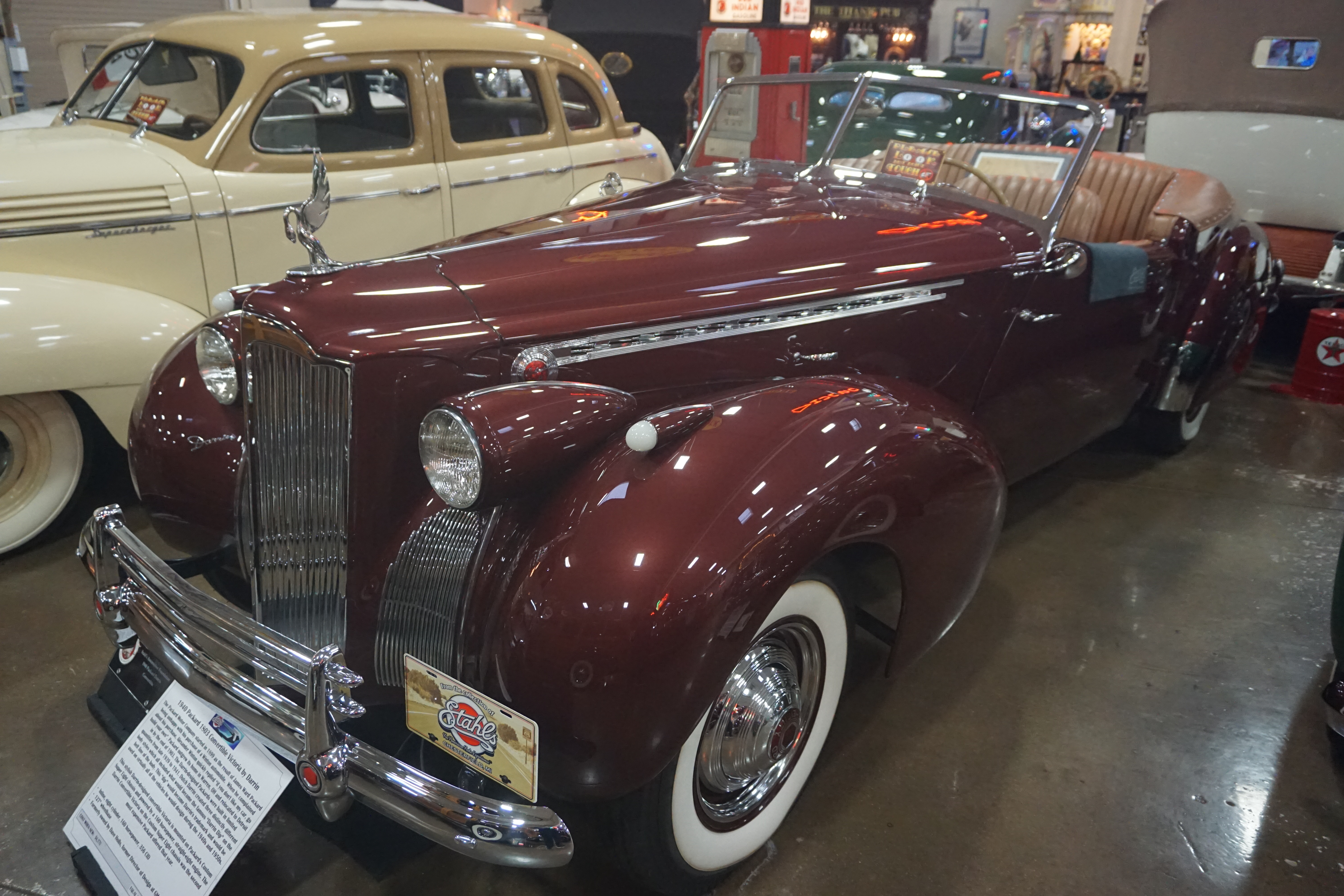
1940 Packard 1803 Convertible Victoria by Darrin

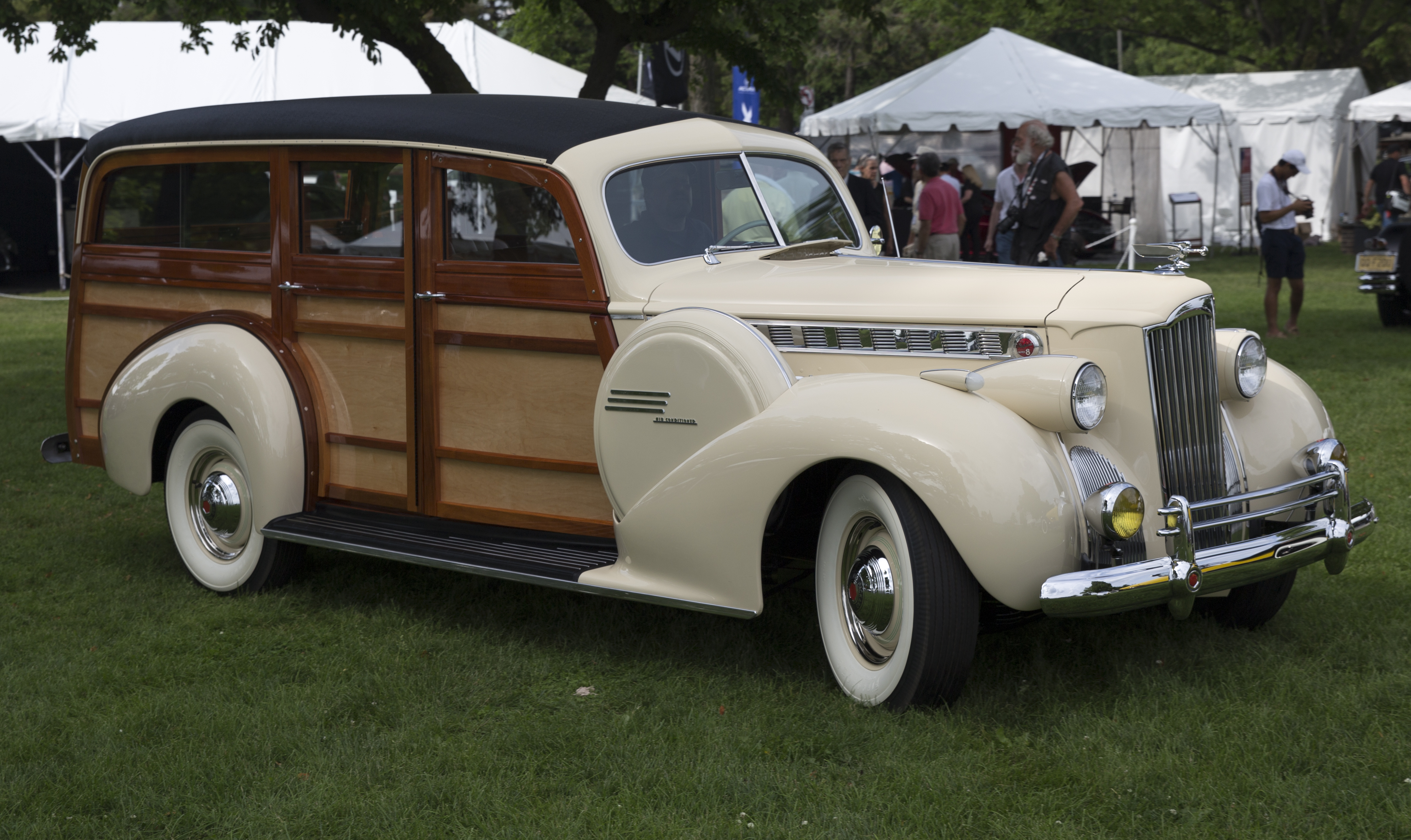
1940 Packard Super Eight One-Sixty Station Wagon (model 1803)

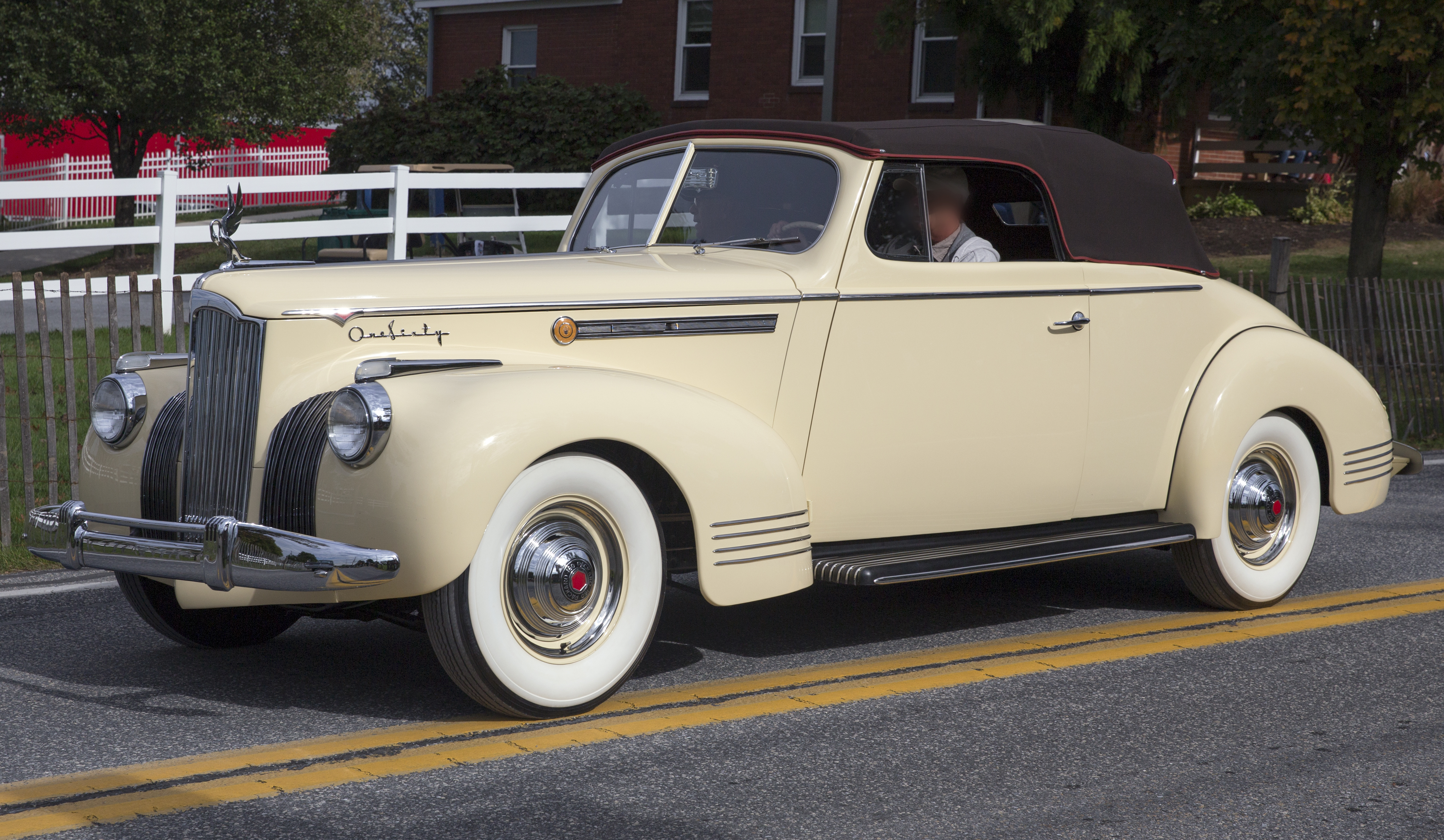
1941 Packard Super Eight One-Sixty Convertible Coupe (model 1903)

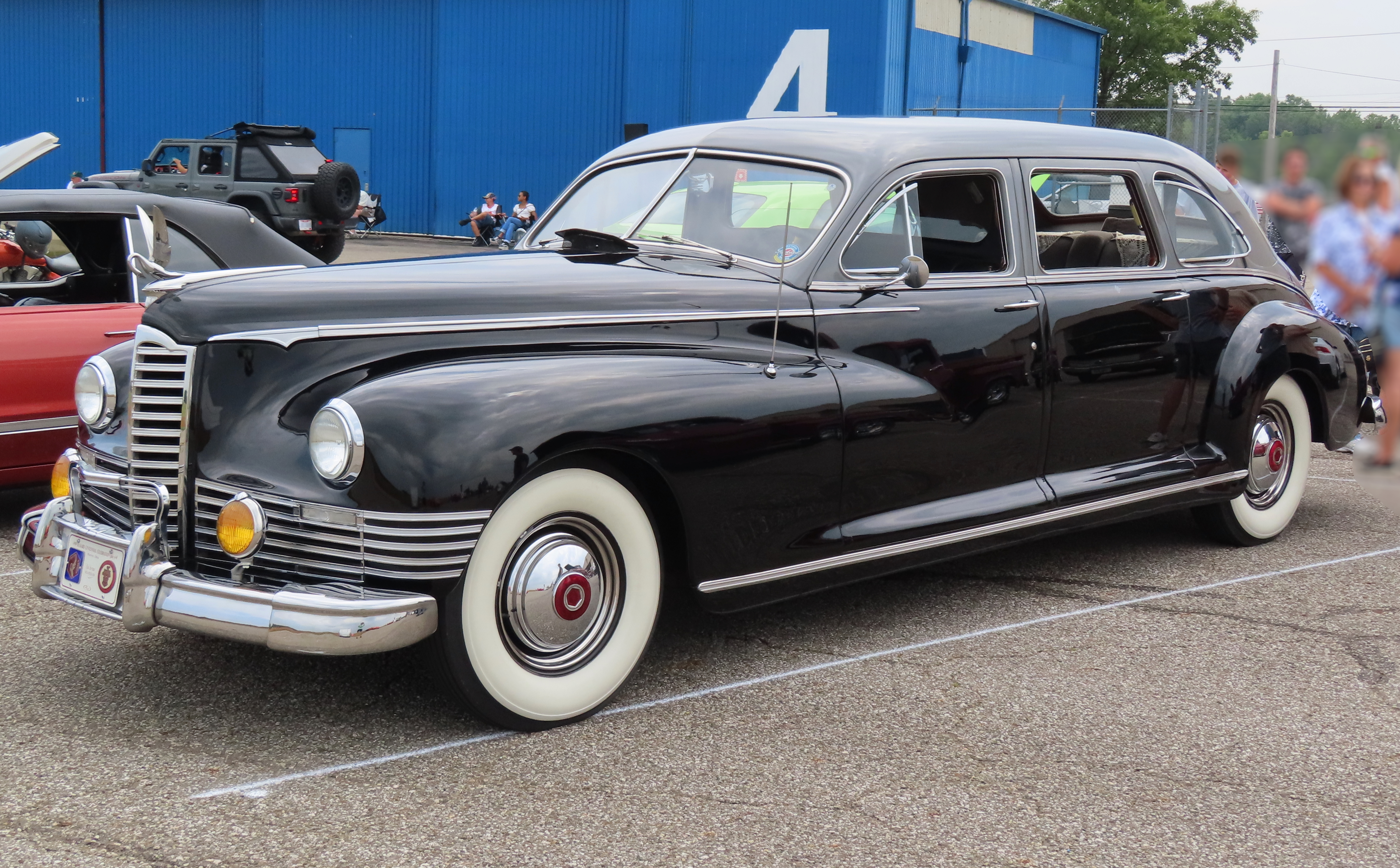
1946 Packard Super Clipper Limousine Series 2103

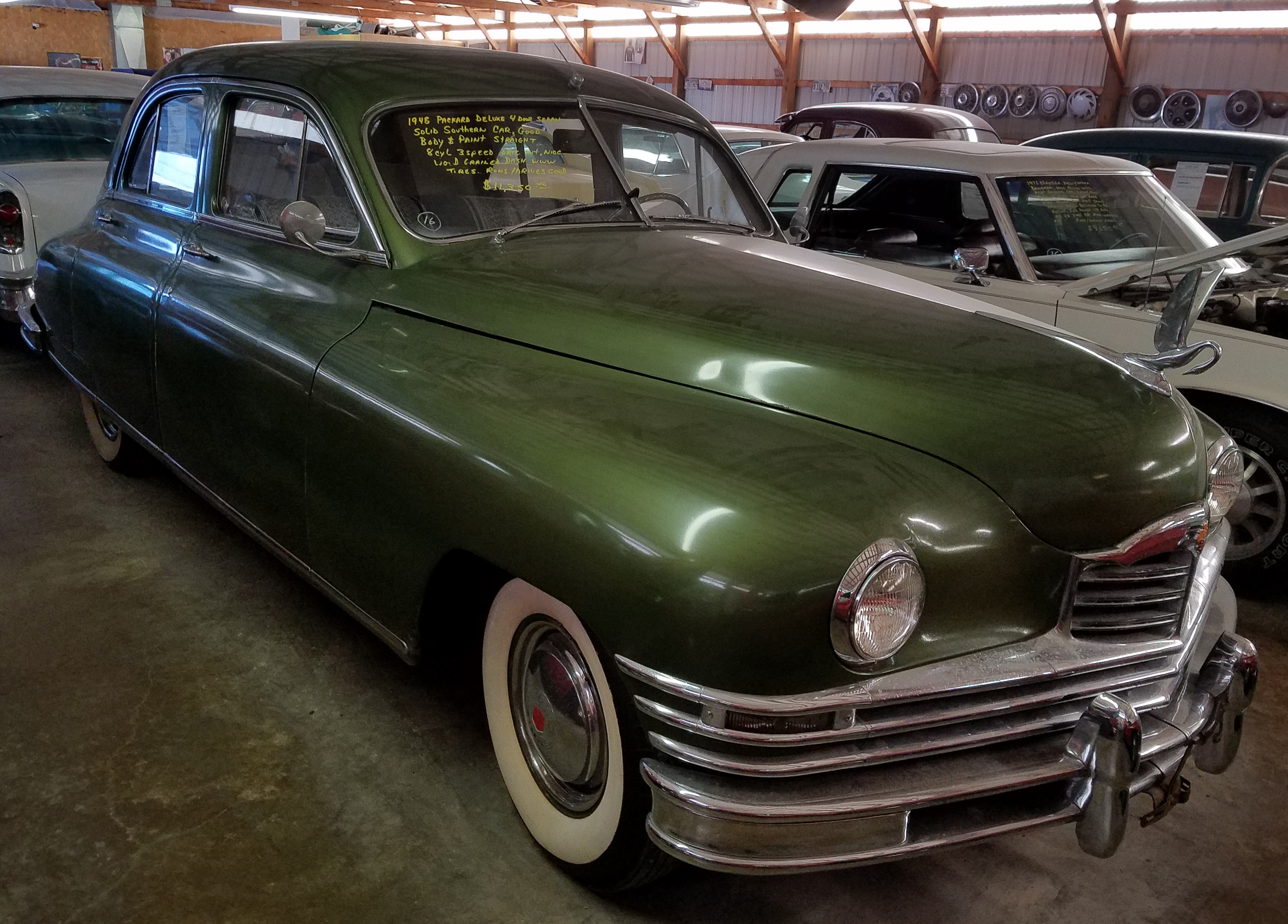
1948 Packard Super Eight Deluxe 4-Door Sedan Series 2222

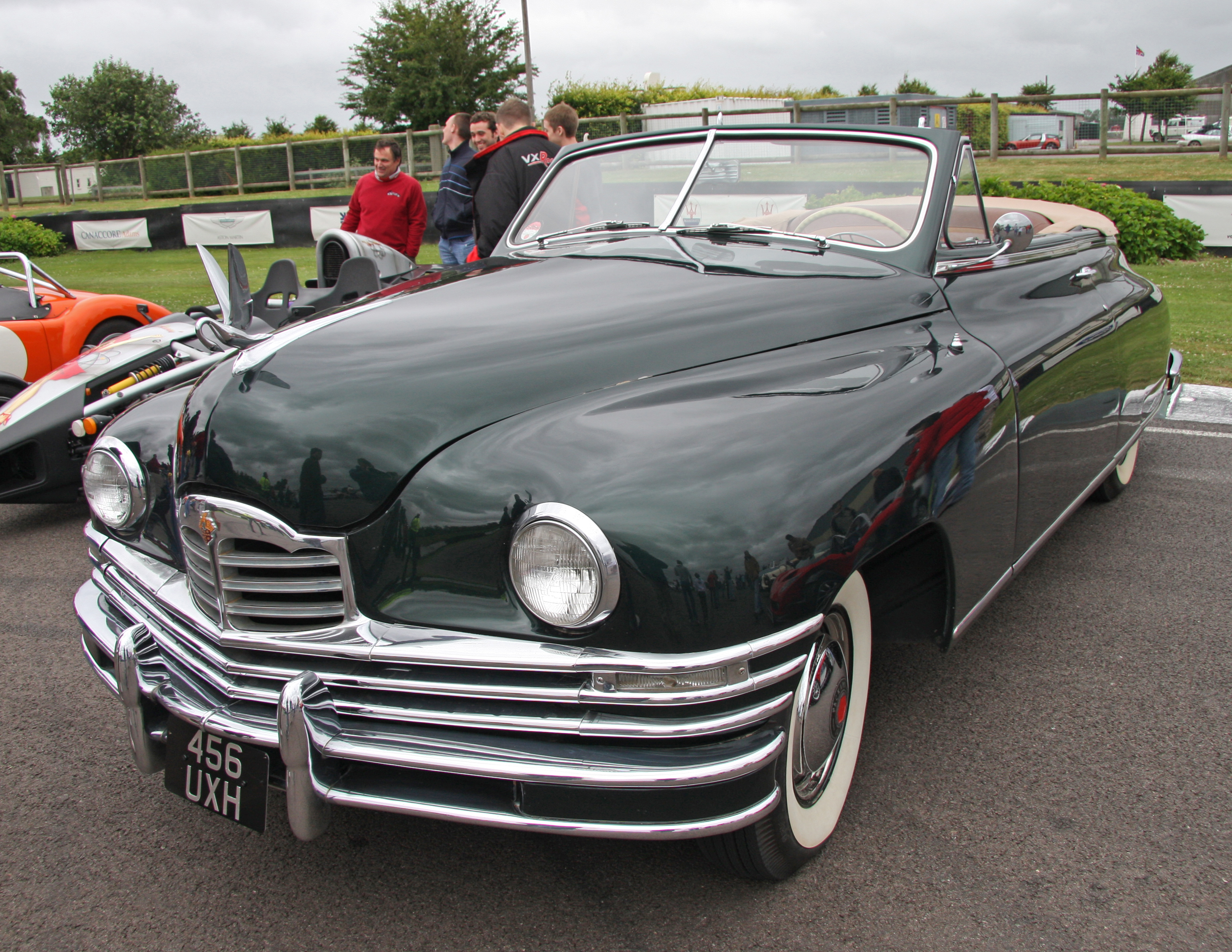
1949 Packard Super Eight Victoria Convertible Series 2332

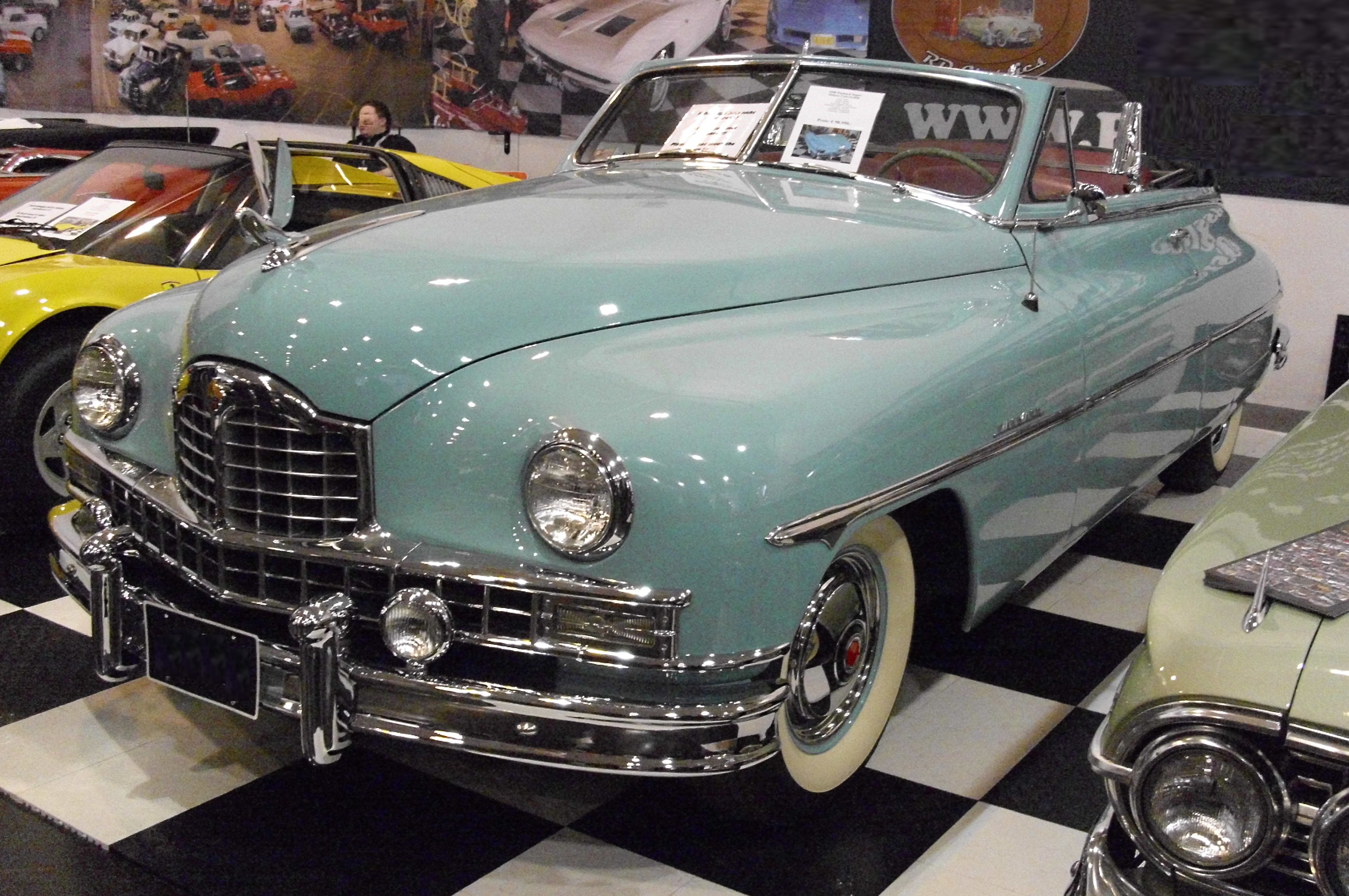
1950 Packard Super Eight Deluxe Victoria Convertible Series 2332
