= Dave Koffel =

Dave Koffel is an American gasser drag racer.

Koffel drove a dark blue 1949 Packard, dubbed Flintstone Flyer, in E/Gas. He later drove a 1959 Studebaker, Flintstone Flyer Too, in F/G.

The Packard, built in Koffel's garage, had a 292 cu in (4,790 cc) Chevrolet V8 (from a 1961 Corvette) and a four-speed manual transmission. The motor was a 283 cubic inch motor that was bored out to achieve 292 cubic inches.

In 1961, Koffel fitted the car with fuel injection, setting a new NHRA national record in E/G at 13.33 seconds and 104.04 mph (167.44 km/h) at the NHRA Nationals at Indianapolis Raceway Park. He went on to win the 1962 NHRA E/G national title, with a pass of 13.71 seconds at 102.85 mph (165.52 km/h). It was his first gasser class title.

In 1963, Koffel replaced the steel front end panels with custom fiberglass items produced by Walt Sari of Ashtabula, Ohio. With the fiberglass panels fitted, Flintstone Flyer won the F/G national title at the NHRA Nationals in Indianapolis. Koffel recorded a pass of 13.69 seconds at 101.80 mph (163.83 km/h).

== Sources ==
- Davis, Larry. Gasser Wars, North Branch, MN: Cartech, 2003, pp. 13, 183, and 187.
