= Flintstone Flyer =

Corvette-powered 1949 Packard automobile

Overview
- Manufacturer: Packard
- Production: 1961
- Model years: 1961-1964
- Designer: Dave Koffel

Body and chassis
- Class: Gasser
- Body style: 4-door Sedan
- Layout: Front Engine RWD
- Platform: 1949 Packard Custom Super Eight
- Related: Packard Custom Super Eight; Chevrolet Corvette C1

Powertrain
- Engine: 4,790 cc (292.3 cu in; 4.8 L) Chevrolet Small Block V8
- Power output: 436 bhp (442.0 PS; 325.1 kW) @ 5,000 rpm 451 lb⋅ft (611.5 N⋅m) @ 3,000 rpm
- Transmission: 4-speed Manual, from a Corvette

Dimensions
- Wheelbase: 3,581 mm (141.0 in)
- Length: 5,730 mm (225.6 in)
- Width: 1,968 mm (77.5 in)
- Height: 1,524.0 mm (60 in)
- Curb weight: 4,430 lb (2,009.4 kg)

The Flintstone Flyer is a Corvette-powered 1949 Packard gasser of the 1960s, built and driven by Dave Koffel. It set one national class record (in 1961) and won two class titles (1962 and 1963).

== History ==
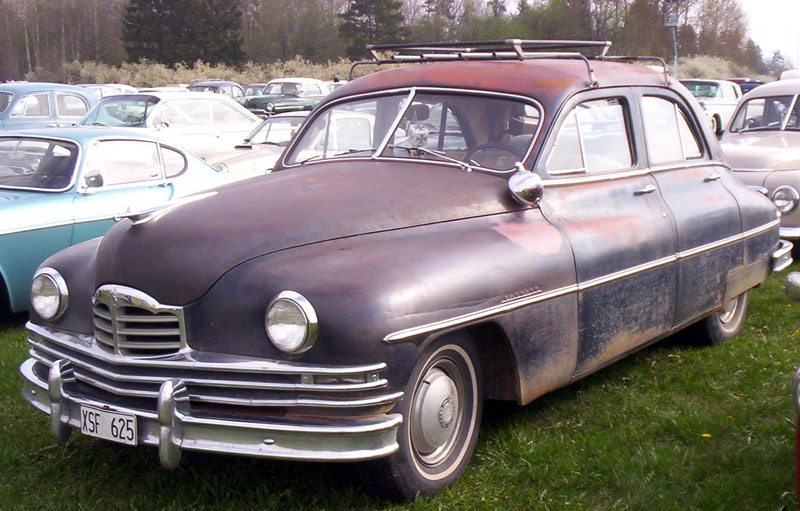
The Packard used was almost exactly like this one, but in blue.

The car was a dark blue 1949 Packard, purchased for US$50 and built in Koffel's own garage.

The engine was swapped for a 4,790 cc (292.3 cu in) Chevrolet small-block V8 (from a 1961 Corvette bored 0.060 in (1.5 mm) over). It was only mildly modified, fitted with 270 heads solid-lifter camshaft, and Offenhauser intake manifold (with three two-barrel (twin-choke) carburetors).

The transmission was a four-speed manual from a Corvette, and the rear axle came from a 1957 Plymouth with a steep 6.17:1 ratio (because of the car's high weight, 4,430 lb (2,009.4 kg)).

In 1961, Koffel changed the three deuces to Hilborn fuel injection. In this trim, the car set a new NHRA national record in E/G at 13.33 seconds and 104.04 mph (167.44 km/h).

It won the 1962 E/G national title at the NHRA Nationals, Indianapolis Raceway Park, with a pass of 13.71 seconds at 102.85 mph (165.52 km/h).

In 1963, Koffel replaced the steel front end panels with custom fiberglass items produced by Walt Sari of Ashtabula, Ohio. With the fiberglass panels fitted, 'Flintstone Flyer won the 1963 F/G national title at the NHRA Nationals in Indianapolis, with a pass of 13.69 seconds at 101.80 mph (163.83 km/h).

== Sources ==
- Davis, Larry. Gasser Wars, North Branch, MN: Cartech, 2003, pp.180-8.
