= Chevrolet Corvette (C1) =

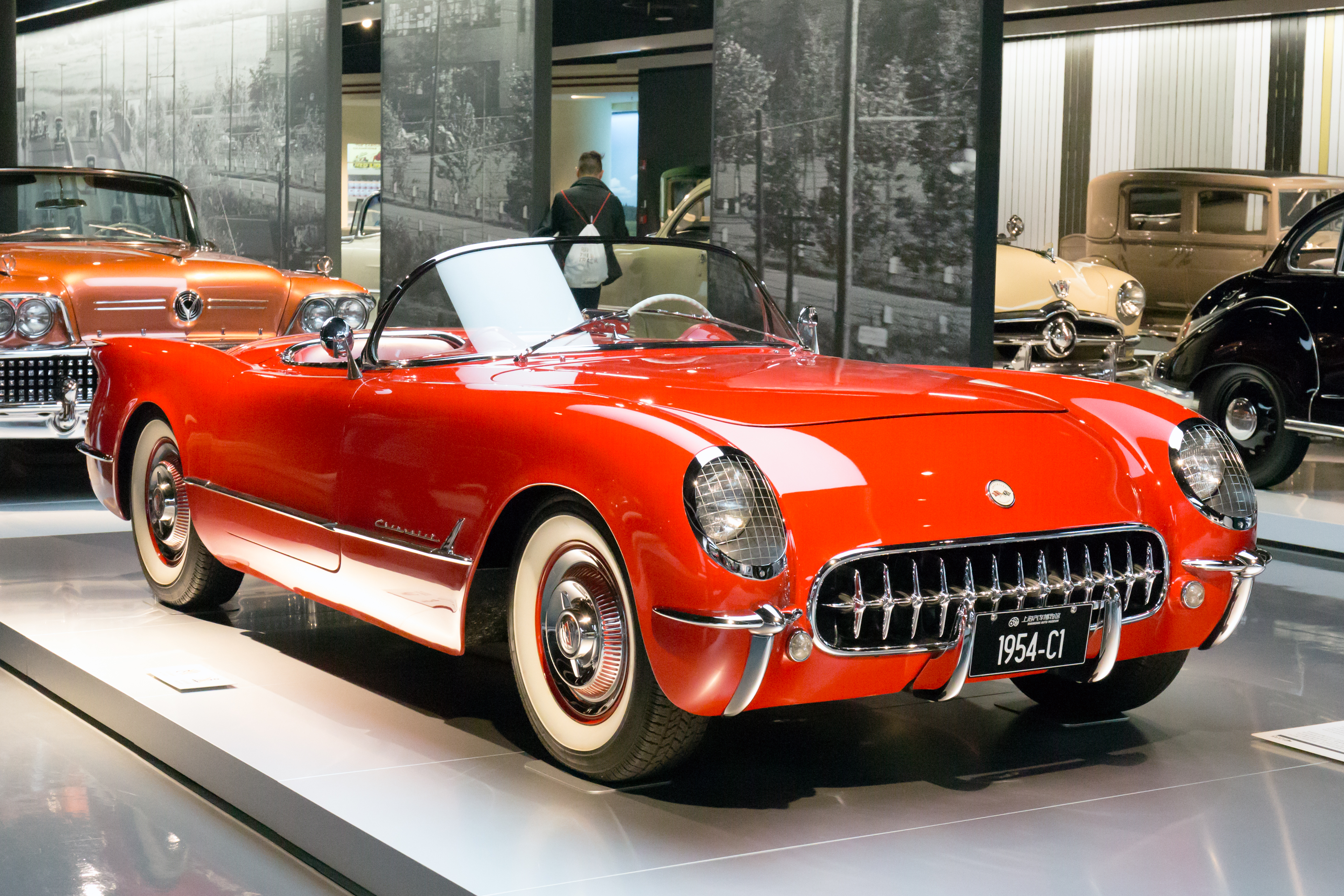
- 1954 Corvette

Overview
- Manufacturer: Chevrolet (General Motors)
- Production: June 1953–July 1962
- Model years: 1953–1962
- Assembly: United States: Flint Assembly, Flint, Michigan (1953–early 1954); United States: St. Louis Assembly, St. Louis, Missouri (early 1954–1962)
- Designer: Harley Earl; Bob Cadaret (1956)

Body and chassis
- Class: Sports car
- Body style: 2-door convertible/roadster
- Layout: FR layout
- Platform: Series E2934 (1953–1957); Series J800 (1958-1959); Series 0800 (1960-1962)
- Chassis: Body-on-frame
- Related: Chevrolet Corvette Scaglietti Coupe

Powertrain
- Engine: 235 cu in (3.9 L) Blue Flame I6; 265 cu in (4.3 L) Small-block V8; 283 cu in (4.6 L) Small-block V8; 327 cu in (5.4 L) Small-block V8
- Transmission: 2-speed Powerglide automatic; 3-speed manual; 4-speed manual

Dimensions
- Wheelbase: 102.0 in (2,591 mm) (1953–1962)
- Length: 167.3 in (4,249 mm) (1953–1955); 168.0 in (4,267 mm) (1956–1957); 177.2 in (4,501 mm) (1958–1962)
- Width: 69.8 in (1,773 mm) (1953–1955); 70.5 in (1,791 mm) (1956–1957); 72.8 in (1,849 mm) (1958–1961); 70.4 in (1,788 mm) (1962)
- Height: 51.5 in (1,308 mm) (1953–1957); 51 in (1,295 mm) (1958–1962)
- Curb weight: 2,886 lb (1,309 kg) (1953–1954, 1956); 2,805 lb (1,272 kg) (1955); 2,849 lb (1,292 kg) (1957); 2,926 lb (1,327 kg) (1958); 2,975 lb (1,349 kg) (1959); 2,985 lb (1,354 kg) (1960–1961); 3,065 lb (1,390 kg) (1962)

Chronology
- Successor: Chevrolet Corvette (C2)

The Chevrolet Corvette (C1) is the first generation of the Corvette sports car produced by Chevrolet. It was introduced late in the 1953 model year and produced through 1962. This generation is commonly called the "solid-axle" generation, as an independent rear suspension did not appear until the 1963 Sting Ray.

The Corvette was rushed into production for its debut model year to capitalize on the enthusiastic public reaction to the concept vehicle. However, expectations for the new model were largely unfulfilled. Reviews were mixed, and sales fell far short of expectations through the car's early years. The program was nearly canceled by General Motors, but decided to make necessary improvements because Ford was developing a two-seater that became the Thunderbird.

== History ==
=== Origins ===
As head of GM's Styling Section, Harley Earl was an avid sports car fan. He recognized that GIs returning after serving overseas in the years following World War II were bringing home MGs, Jaguars, and Alfa Romeos. In 1951, Nash Motors began selling an expensive two-seat sports car, the Nash-Healey, that was made in partnership with the Italian designer Pininfarina and British auto engineer Donald Healey, but there were few moderate-priced models. Earl convinced GM that they needed to build an all-American two-seat sports car, and with his Special Projects crew began working on the new car in late 1951. The last time Chevrolet offered a two-door, two-passenger convertible/roadster body style was in 1938 with the Chevrolet Master.

==== Prototype EX-122 ====
The secretive effort was code-named "Project Opel" (after GM's German division Opel). The result was the hand-built, EX-122 pre-production Corvette prototype, which was first shown to the public at the 1953 General Motors Motorama at the Waldorf-Astoria in New York City on January 17, 1953. When production began six months later, at an MSRP of US$3,513 ($42,274 in 2025 dollars), it had evolved into a considerably costlier car than the basic $2,000 roadster Harley Earl originally had in mind. The EX-122 car is now housed at the Kerbeck Corvette museum in Atlantic City. It is believed to be the oldest Corvette in existence.

==== Design and engineering ====
The design and engineering team headed by Earl included body engineer Vincent Kaptur, Sr., draftsman Carl Peebles, clay modeler Bill Bloch, Tony Balthasar, and engineer Robert McLean, who laid out the unique chassis design. They utilized off-the-shelf mechanical components to keep costs down. The new car used the chassis and suspension design from 1949 through 1954 Chevrolet passenger vehicles. The drivetrain and passenger compartment were moved rearward to achieve a 53/47 front-to-rear weight distribution. It had a 102 in (2,591 mm) wheelbase. The engine was a 235 cu in (3.85 L) inline six engine that was similar to the 235 engine that powered all other Chevrolet car models, but with a higher-compression ratio, three Carter side-draft carburetors, mechanical lifters, and a higher-lift camshaft. Output was rated at 150 hp (112 kW). A two-speed Powerglide automatic had to be used because no manual transmission was available to Chevrolet that could handle 150 HP. The 0–60 mph (0–97 km/h) acceleration time was 11.5 seconds.

Three body variants were created. The roadster was built as the Corvette, the Corvair fastback variant never went into production, and the two-door Nomad station wagon was eventually built as the Chevrolet Nomad.

Corvette Corvair Show Car
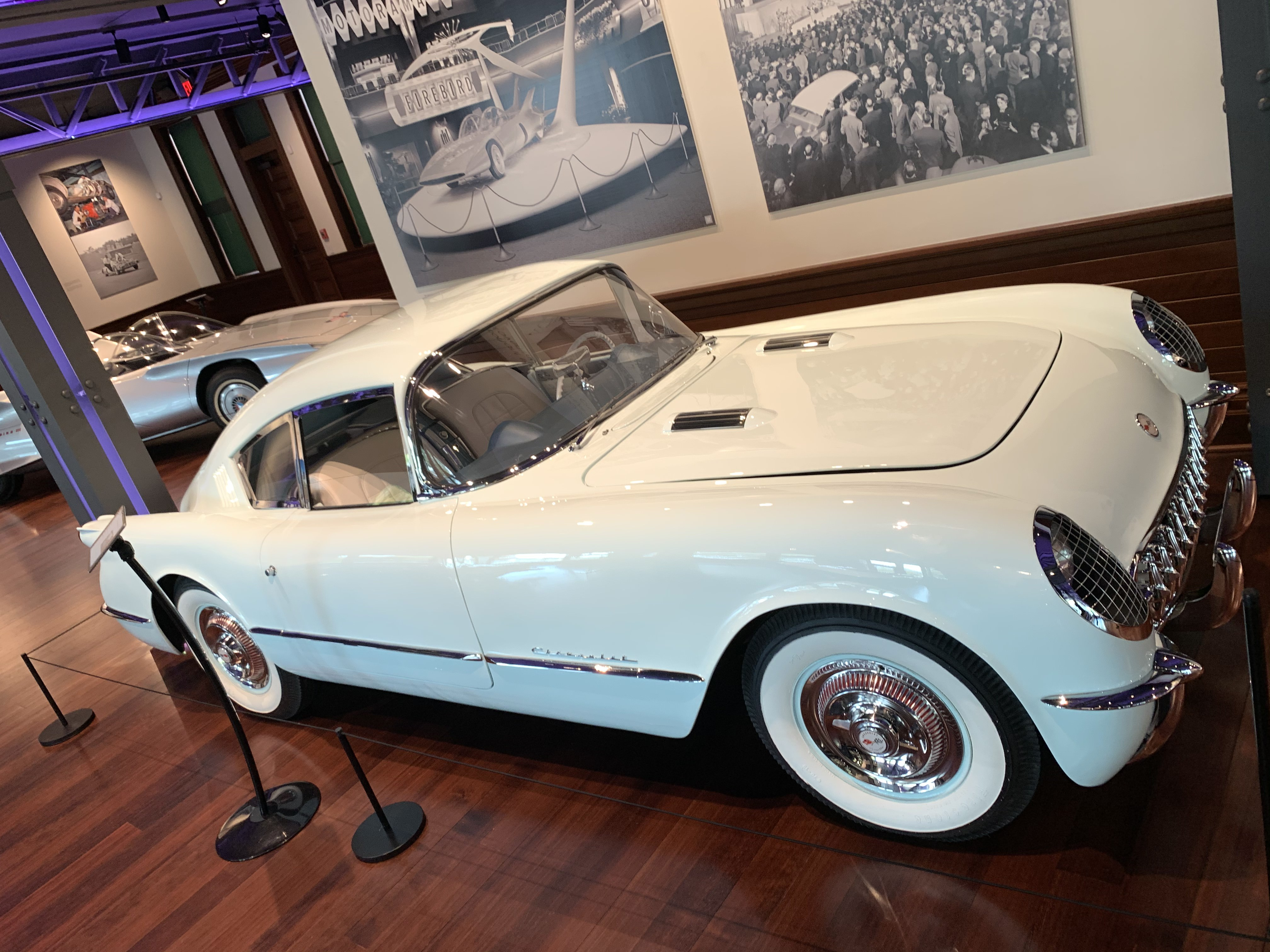
Corvette Corvair show car, front view

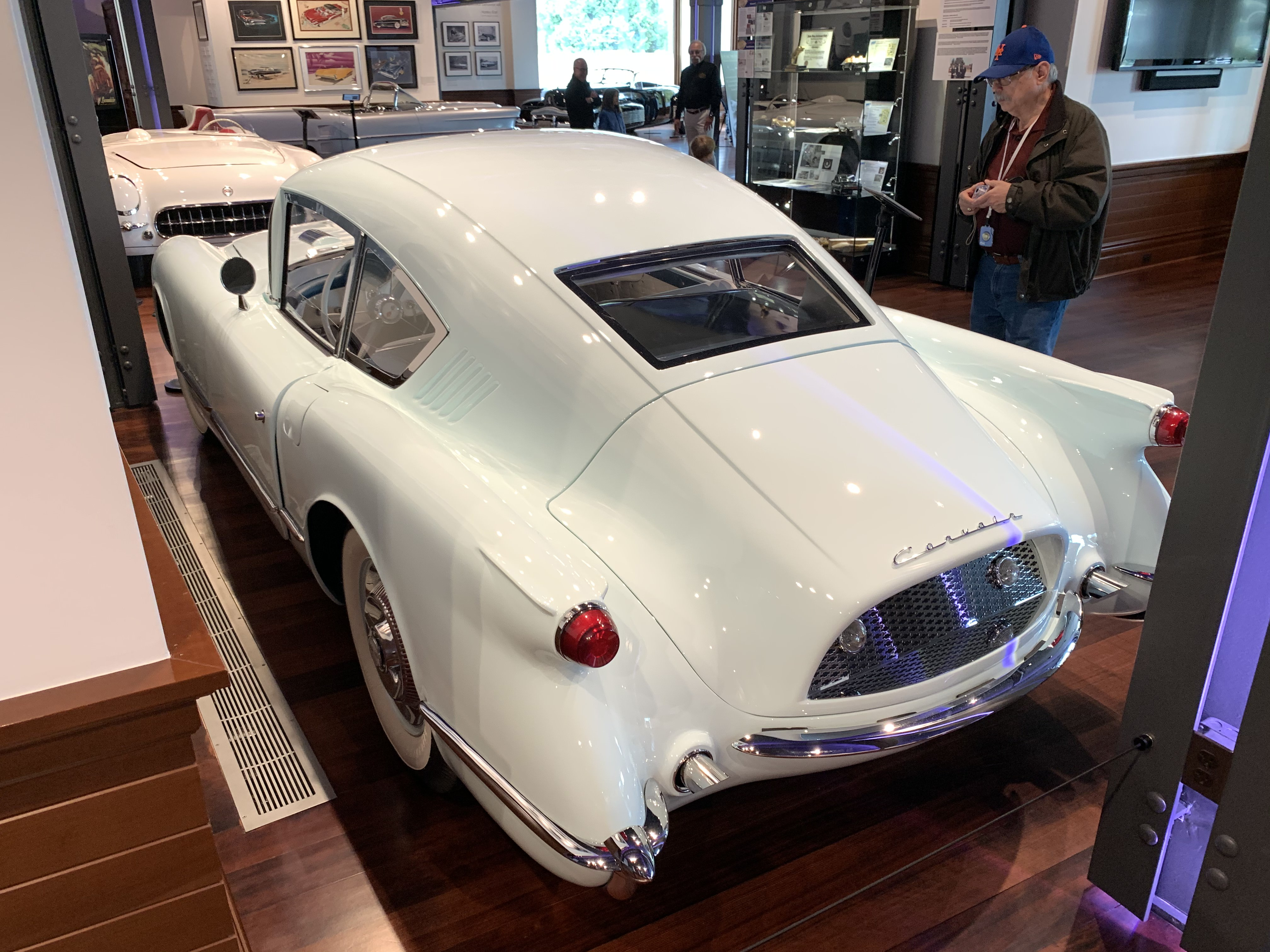
Corvette Corvair show car, rear view

During the last half of 1953, 300 Corvettes were, to a large degree, hand-built on a makeshift assembly line that was installed in an old truck plant in Flint, Michigan, while a factory was being prepped for a full-scale 1954 production run. The outer body was made of then-revolutionary glass fiber reinforced plastic material. Although steel shortages or quotas are sometimes mentioned as a factor in the decision to use fiberglass, no evidence exists to support this. In calendar years 1952 and 1953, Chevrolet produced nearly two million steel-bodied full-size passenger cars, and the intended production volume of 10,000 Corvettes for 1954 was only a small fraction of that.

The body engineer for the Corvette was Ellis James Premo. He presented a paper to the Society of Automotive Engineers in 1954 regarding the development of the body. Several excerpts highlight some of the points in the body material choice:

The body on the show model was made of reinforced plastic purely as an expedient to get the job done quickly.

Although we were going ahead with the building of an experimental plastic body in order to get a car rolling for chassis development work – at the time of the Waldorf Show, we were actually concentrating body-design-wise on a steel body utilizing Kirksite tooling for the projected production of 10,000 units during the 1954 model year. It was some time later that we decided to produce this quantity in reinforced plastic.

About this time, some doubt was expressed that we should build the 1954 model of steel. People seemed to be captivated by the idea of the fiberglass plastic body. Furthermore, information being given to us by the reinforced plastic industry seemed to indicate the practicality of fabricating plastic body parts for automobiles on a large scale.

The safety glass windshield was raked 55 degrees. The rear license plate holder was set back in the trunk lid and covered with a plastic window. Underneath the new body material were standard components from Chevrolet's regular car line, including the "Blue Flame" inline six-cylinder engine, two-speed Powerglide automatic transmission, and drum brakes. A Carter triple-carburetor system was exclusive to the Corvette, which increased the standard engine's output to 150 hp. Still, the performance of the car was decidedly "lackluster". Compared to the British and Italian sports cars of the day, the Corvette lacked a manual transmission and required more effort to bring to a stop, but like their British competition, such as Morgan, was not fitted with roll-up windows; this would have to wait until some time in the 1956 model year. A Paxton centrifugal supercharger became available in 1954 as a dealer-installed option, significantly improving the Corvette's straight-line performance, but sales continued to decline.

The Chevrolet division was GM's entry-level marque. Managers at GM were seriously considering shelving the project, leaving the Corvette to be little more than a footnote in automotive history, and would have done so if not for three important events. The first was the 1955 introduction of Chevrolet's first V8 engine since 1919.Late in the model year, the new 195 hp (145 kW) 265 small-block became available with a Powerglide automatic transmission, until the middle of the production year when a manual 3-speed became available, coupled to a 3.55:1 axle ratio, the only one offered. The engine was fitted with a single 2218S or 2351S WCFB four-barrel (four-choke) Carter carburetor. The combination turned the "rather anemic Corvette into a credible if not outstanding performer". The second was the influence of a Russian émigré in GM's engineering department, Zora Arkus-Duntov. The third factor in the Corvette's survival was Ford's introduction of the 1955 two-seat Thunderbird. The Ford model featured a V8 engine, was better equipped, and positioned more as a "personal car" rather than a pure sports car. Even so, the Ford-Chevrolet rivalry in those days demanded GM not appear to back down from the challenge. The original concept for the Corvette emblem incorporated an American flag into the design, but was changed before production because the flag cannot be used on a commercial product according to the United States Flag Code.

== 1953–1955 ==
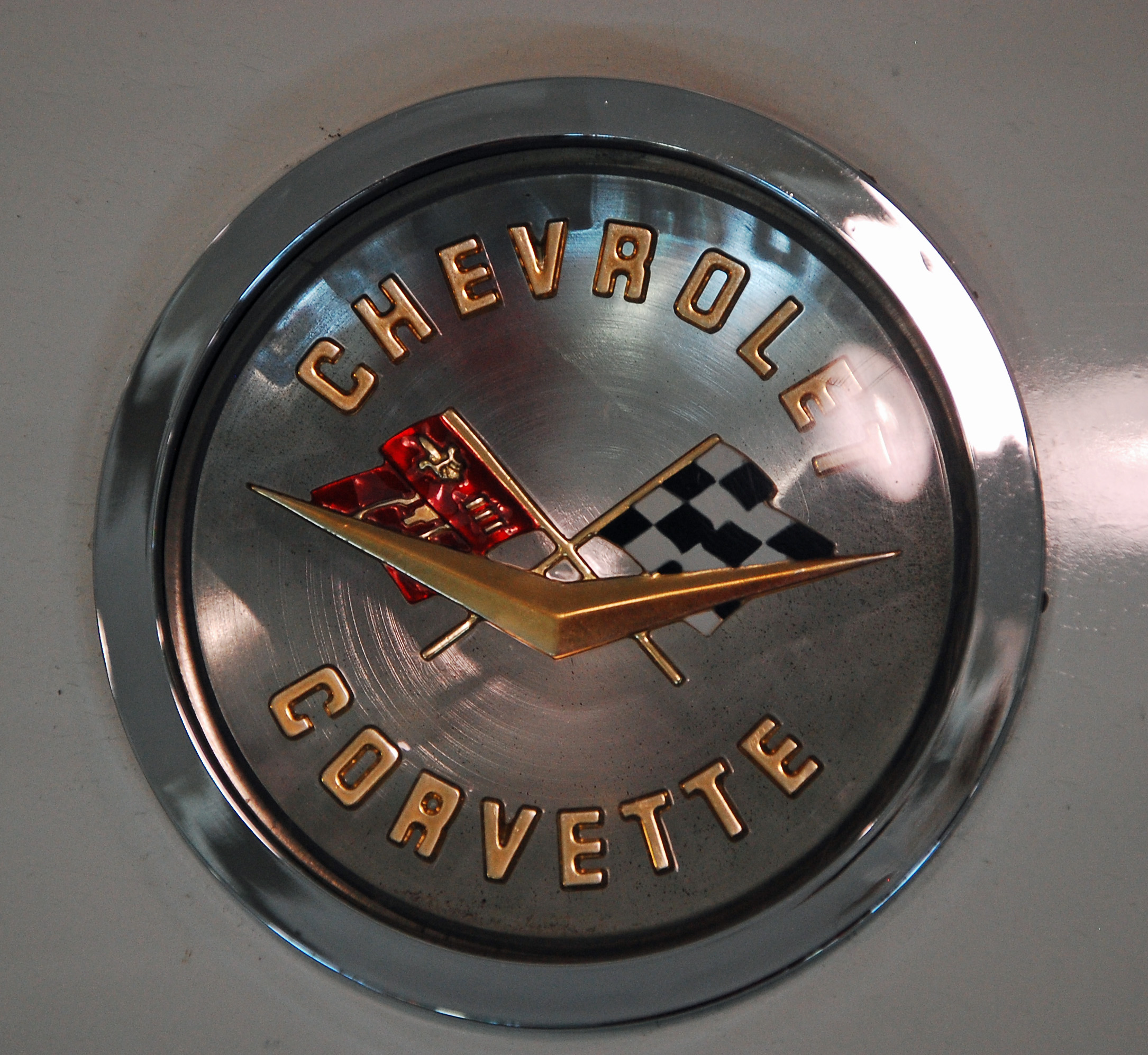
Performance-themed logo

=== 1953 ===
The 1953 model year was not only the Corvette's first production year, but at 300 produced it was also the lowest-volume Corvette. The cars were essentially hand-built and techniques evolved during the production cycle so that each 1953 Corvette is slightly different. All 1953 models had red interiors, Polo white exteriors, and painted blue engines (a reference to the three colors represented on the Flag of the United States, where the Corvette was assembled) as well as black canvas soft tops. Order guides showed heaters and AM radios as optional, but all 1953 models were equipped with both. Over two hundred 1953 Corvettes are known to exist today. They had independent front suspension, but featured a rigid axle supported by longitudinal leaf springs at the rear. The cost of the first production model Corvettes in 1953 was US$3,490 ($38,795 in 2023 dollars).

The quality of the fiberglass body as well as its fit and finish were lacking. Other problems, such as water leaks and doors that could open while the car was driven, were reported with the most severe errors corrected in subsequent units produced, but some shortcomings continued beyond the Corvette's inaugural year. By December 1953, Chevrolet had a newly equipped factory in St. Louis ready to build 10,000 Corvettes annually. However, negative customer reactions to 1953 and early 1954 models caused sales to fall short of expectations.

=== 1954 ===
In 1954, a total of 3,640 of this model were built and nearly a third were unsold at year's end. New colors were available, but the six-cylinder engine and Powerglide automatic, the only engine and transmission available, were not what sports car enthusiasts expected. It is known that 1954 models were painted Pennant Blue, Sportsman Red, and Black, in addition to Polo White. All had red interiors, except for those finished in Pennant Blue which had a beige interior and beige canvas soft top. Order guides listed several options, but all options were "mandatory" and all 1954 Corvettes were equipped the same.

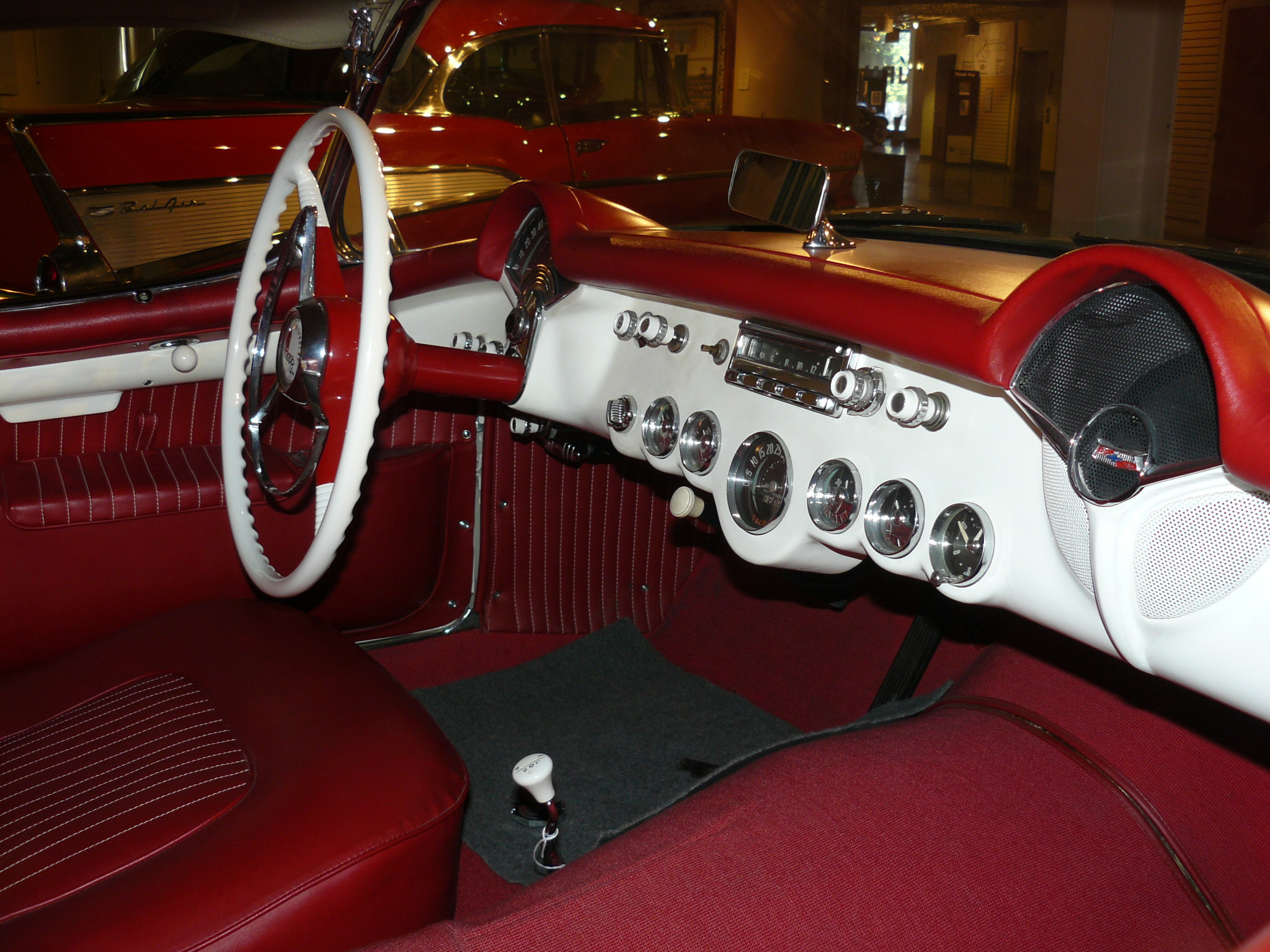
Interior of a 1954 Corvette

In the October 1954 issue of Popular Mechanics, there was an extensive survey of Corvette owners in America. The surprising finding was their opinions in comparison to foreign sports cars. It was found that 36% of those taking the survey had owned a foreign sports car, and of that, half of them rated the Corvette as better than their previous foreign sports car. Nineteen percent rated the Corvette as equal to their foreign sports car and 22% rated the Corvette as inferior. While many were well pleased with the Corvette, they did not consider it a true sports car. The principal complaint of the surveyed owners was the tendency of the body to leak extensively during rainstorms.

=== 1955 ===
Chevrolet debuted its 265 cu in (4.3 L) small-block, 195 hp (145 kW) V8 in 1955 and the engine was available for the Corvette. Early production 1955 V8 Corvettes continued with the mandatory-option Powerglide automatic transmission (as did the few 6-cylinder models built). A new three-speed manual transmission became available later in the year for V8 models, but was not popular with about 75 equipped with it. Exterior color choices were expanded to at least five, combined with at least four interior colors. Soft-tops came in white, dark green, or beige and different materials. A total of 700 1955 Corvettes were built, making it second only to 1953 in scarcity. The "V" in the Corvette emblem was enlarged and gold colored, signifying the V8 engine and 12-volt electrical systems, while 6-cylinder models retained the 6-volt systems used in 1953–54.

Although not a part of the original Corvette project, Zora Arkus-Duntov was responsible for the addition of the V8 engine and three-speed manual transmission. Duntov improved the car's marketing and image and helped the car compete with the new V8—engined Ford Thunderbird, Studebaker Speedster and the larger Chrysler C-300, and turned the Corvette from its lackluster performance into a credible performer. In 1956 he became the director of high-performance vehicle design and development for Chevrolet helping him earn the nickname "Father of the Corvette."

Although the C1 Corvette chassis and suspension design were derived from Chevrolet's full-size cars, the same basic design was continued through the 1962 model even after the full-size cars were completely redesigned for the 1955 model year. This was due to the combined factors of the relatively high reengineering and retooling costs for this low-volume production vehicle, the continued potential for cancellation of the car, and the increased size and weight of the all-new suspension design for the full-size cars, which made it unsuitable for use in the lighter weight Corvette.

1953-1955 Corvette
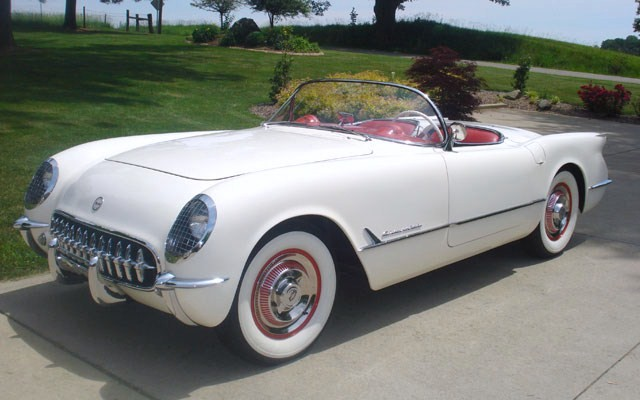
1953

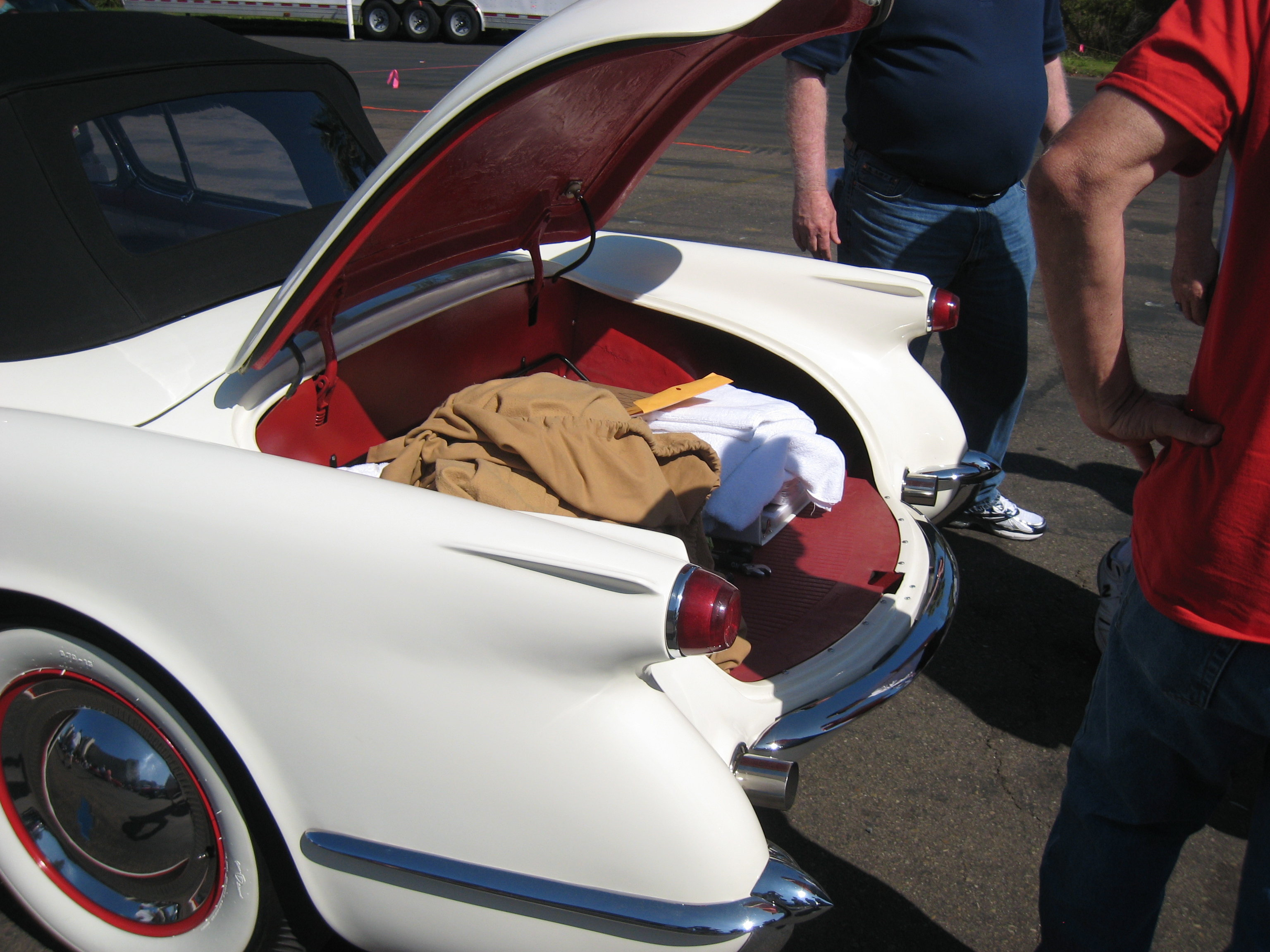
1953

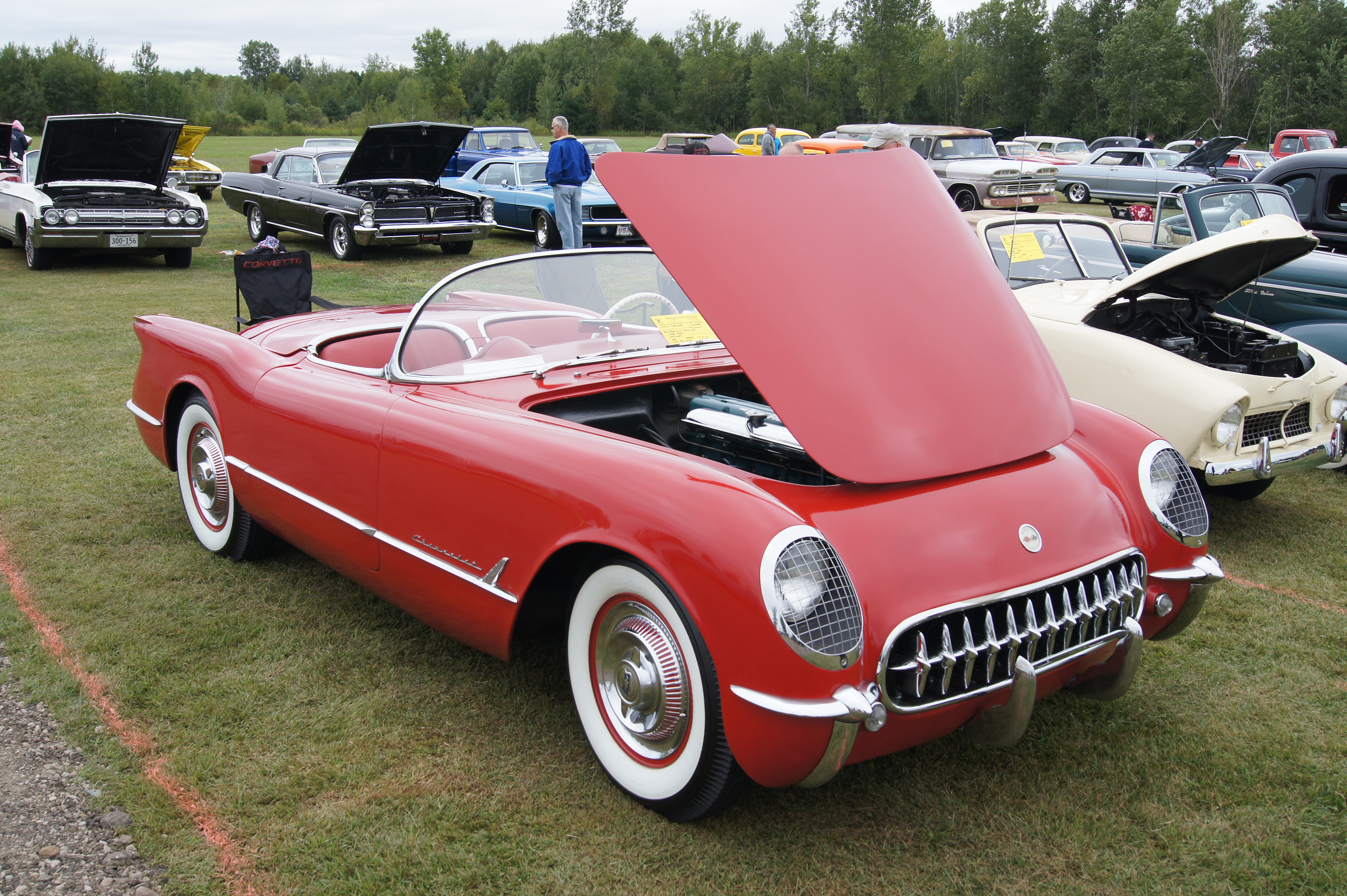
1954

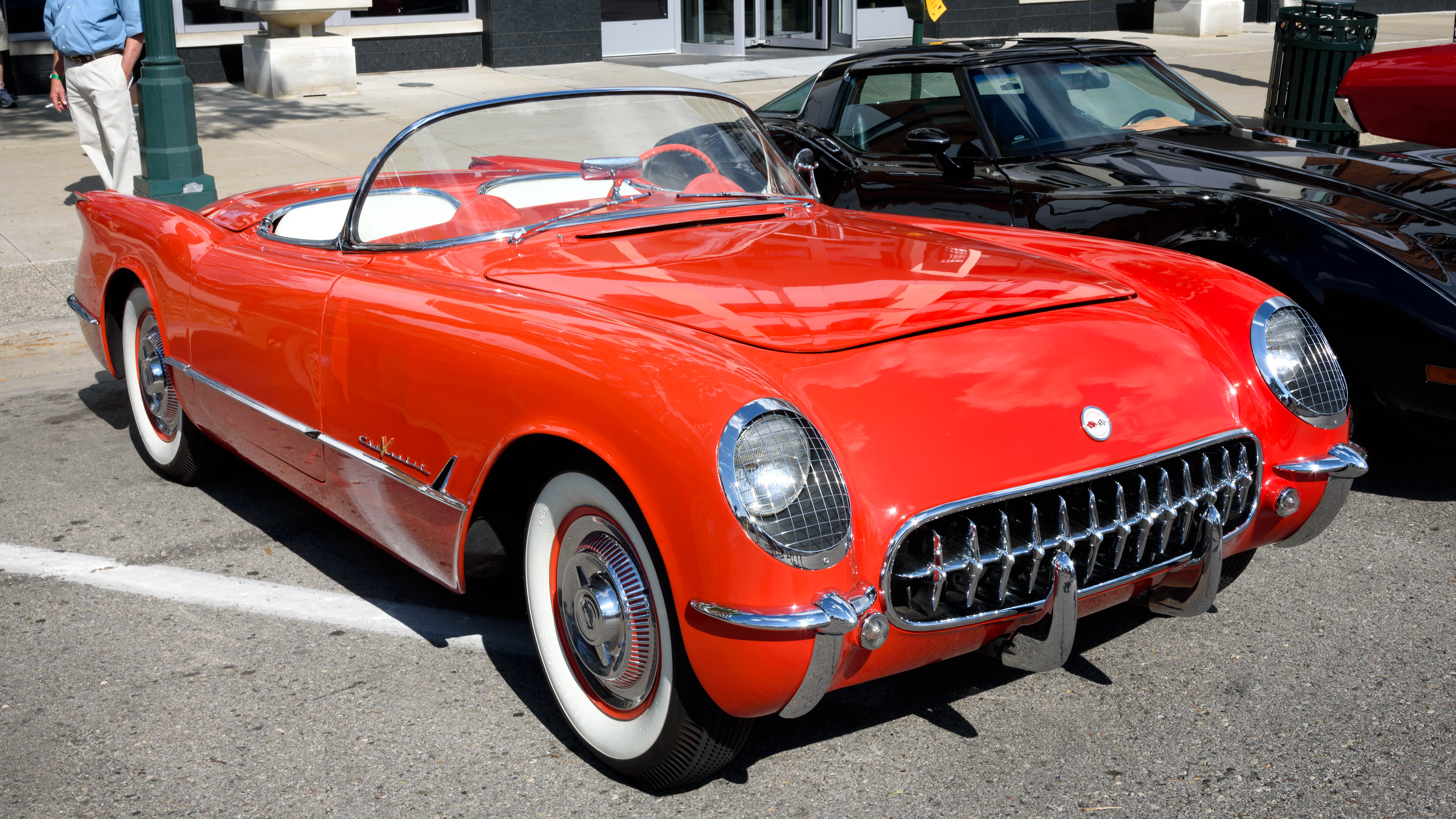
1955

== 1956–1957 ==
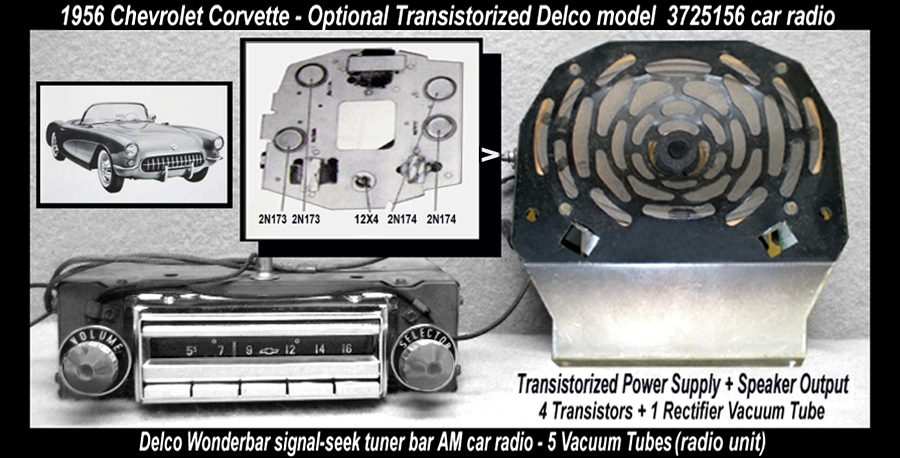
Options in 1956-57 included a car radio that featured both transistors –cutting-edge technology at that time – and a vacuum tube

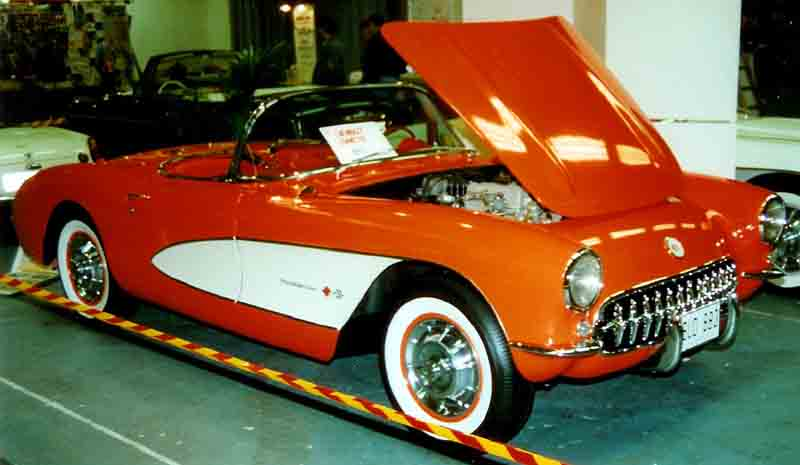
Fuel-injected 1957 convertible

=== 1956 ===
The 1956 Corvette featured a new body, with real glass roll-up windows and a more substantial convertible top. The straight-6 engine was discontinued, leaving only the 265 cu in (4.3 L) V8. Power ranged from 210 to 240 hp (157 to 179 kW). The standard transmission remained the 3-speed manual with an optional 2-speed Powerglide automatic. Other options included power assisted convertible top, a removable hardtop, power windows, and a "then-leading edge" signal-seeking partially transistorized Delco car radio. A high-performance camshaft was also available (as RPO 449) with the 240 hp (179 kW) engine. Sales volume was 3,467, a low number by any contemporary standard and less than 1954's 3,640, making it the third lowest in Corvette history.

=== 1957 ===
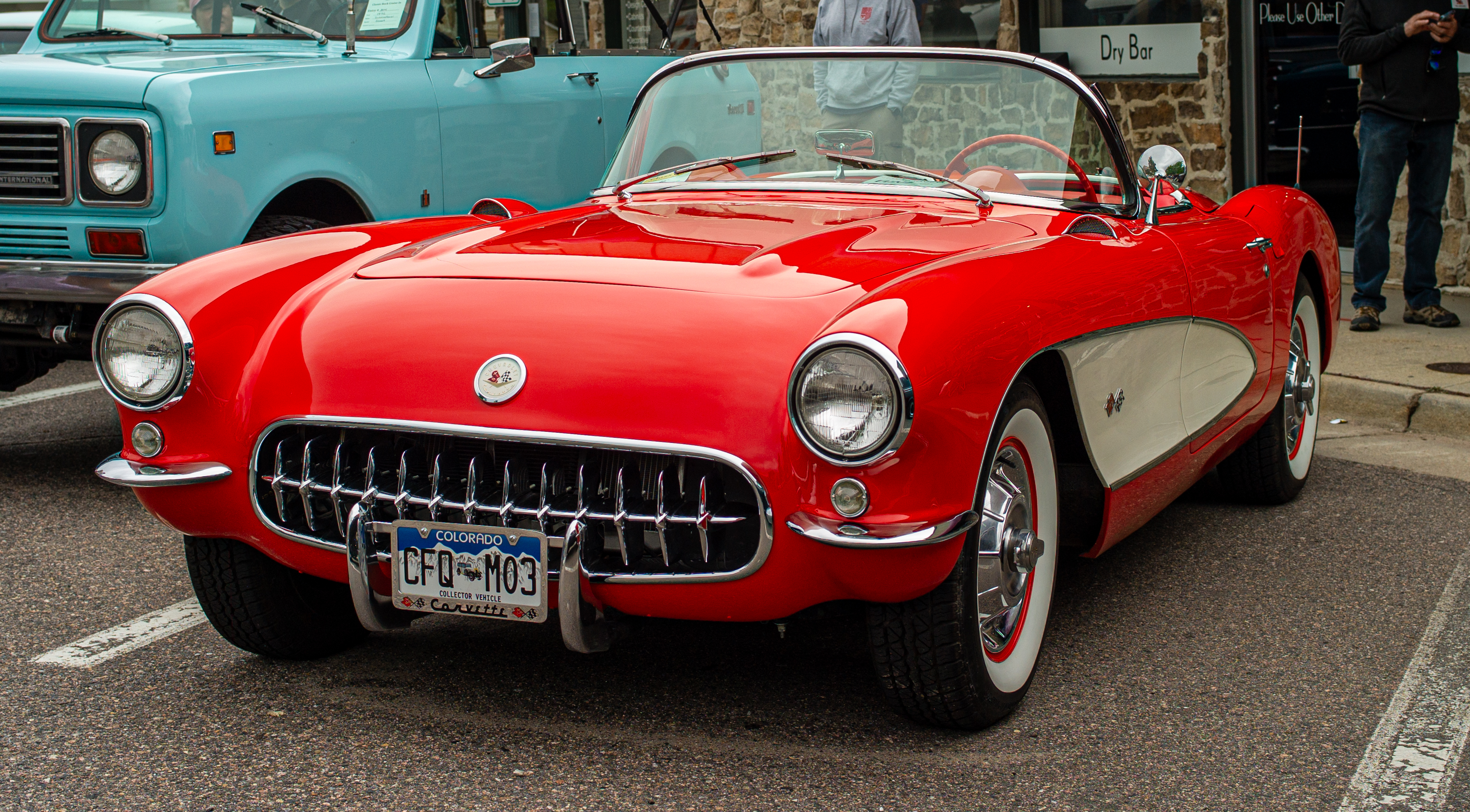
1957 Corvette

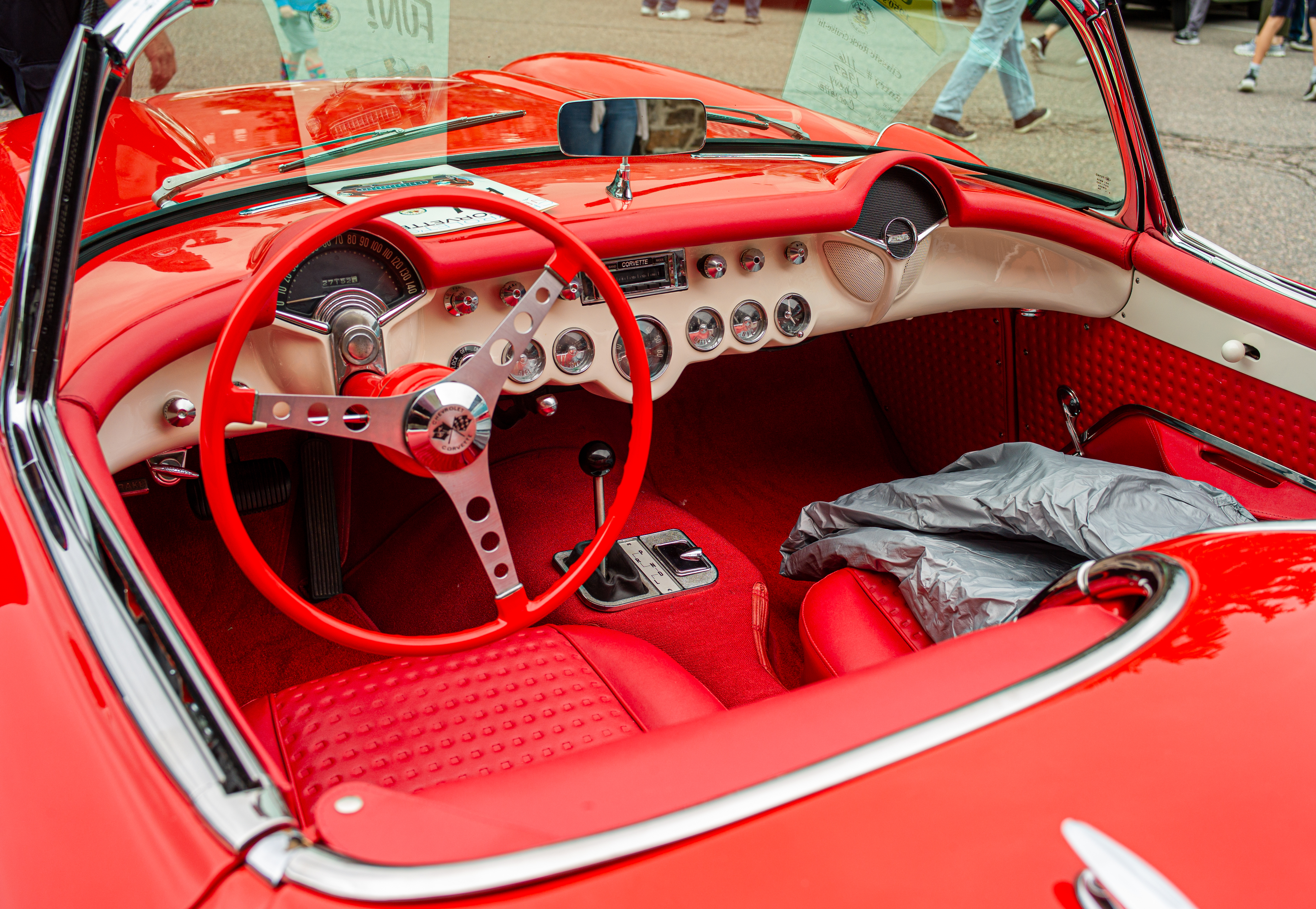
1957 Corvette Dashboard

Visually the 1957 model was unchanged. The V8 was increased to 283 cu in (4.6 L), fuel-injection became a very expensive option, and a 4-speed manual transmission became available after April 9, 1957. GM's Rochester subsidiary used a constant flow system, producing a listed 290 hp (216 kW) at 6200 rpm and 290 lb⋅ft (393 N⋅m) of torque at 4400 rpm. Debate continues to swirl whether this was underrated by Chevrolet (to allow for lower insurance premiums, or give the car an advantage in certain forms of racing) rather than overrated, as was common practice at the time (to juice sales). Either way, it was advertised as producing "One HP per cubic inch", allowing it to claim it was one of the first mass-produced engines to do so.

Pushed toward high-performance and racing, principally by its designer, Zora Arkus-Duntov, who had raced in Europe, 1957 Corvettes could be ordered ready-to-race with special performance options, such as an engine fresh air/tach package, heavy-duty racing suspension, and 15 by 5.5 in (380 by 140 mm) wheels.

Also in 1957, Chevrolet developed a new racing variation of the Corvette with the aim to compete in the 24 Hours of Le Mans race. Originally known as Project XP-64, it would eventually become known as the Corvette SS. It featured a tuned version of the new 283 CID V8 and a specialized tubular space frame chassis. However, after a rear bushing failure retired the car during a 1957 Sebring race, the AMA announced a ban on motor racing in April 1957 for member companies like GM, leading to the cancellation of further developments of the Corvette SS platform.

Sales volume was 6,339, a jump of almost 83%. Fuel-injected models were in short supply and 1,040 were sold.

1956-57 Corvette
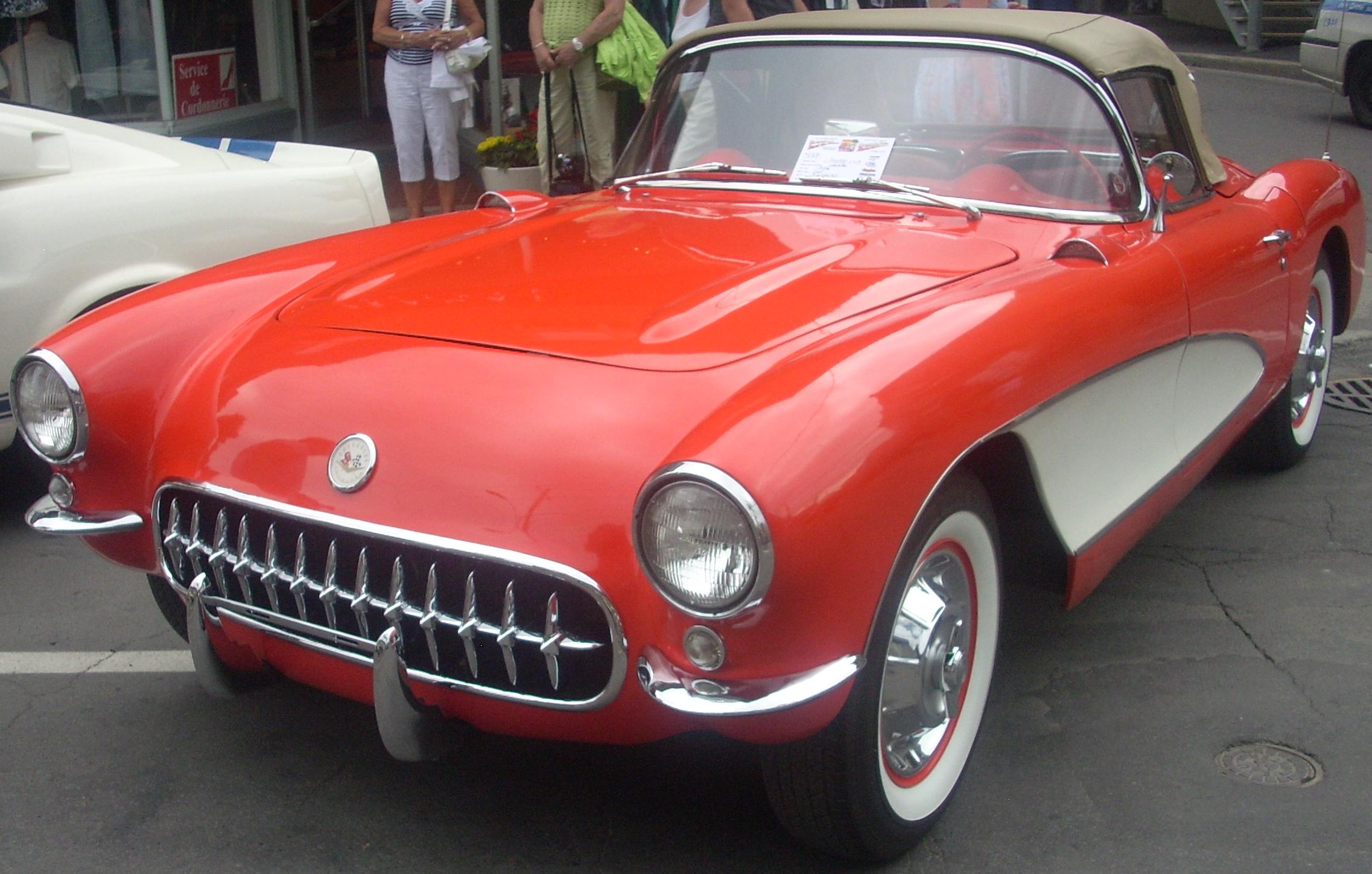
1956

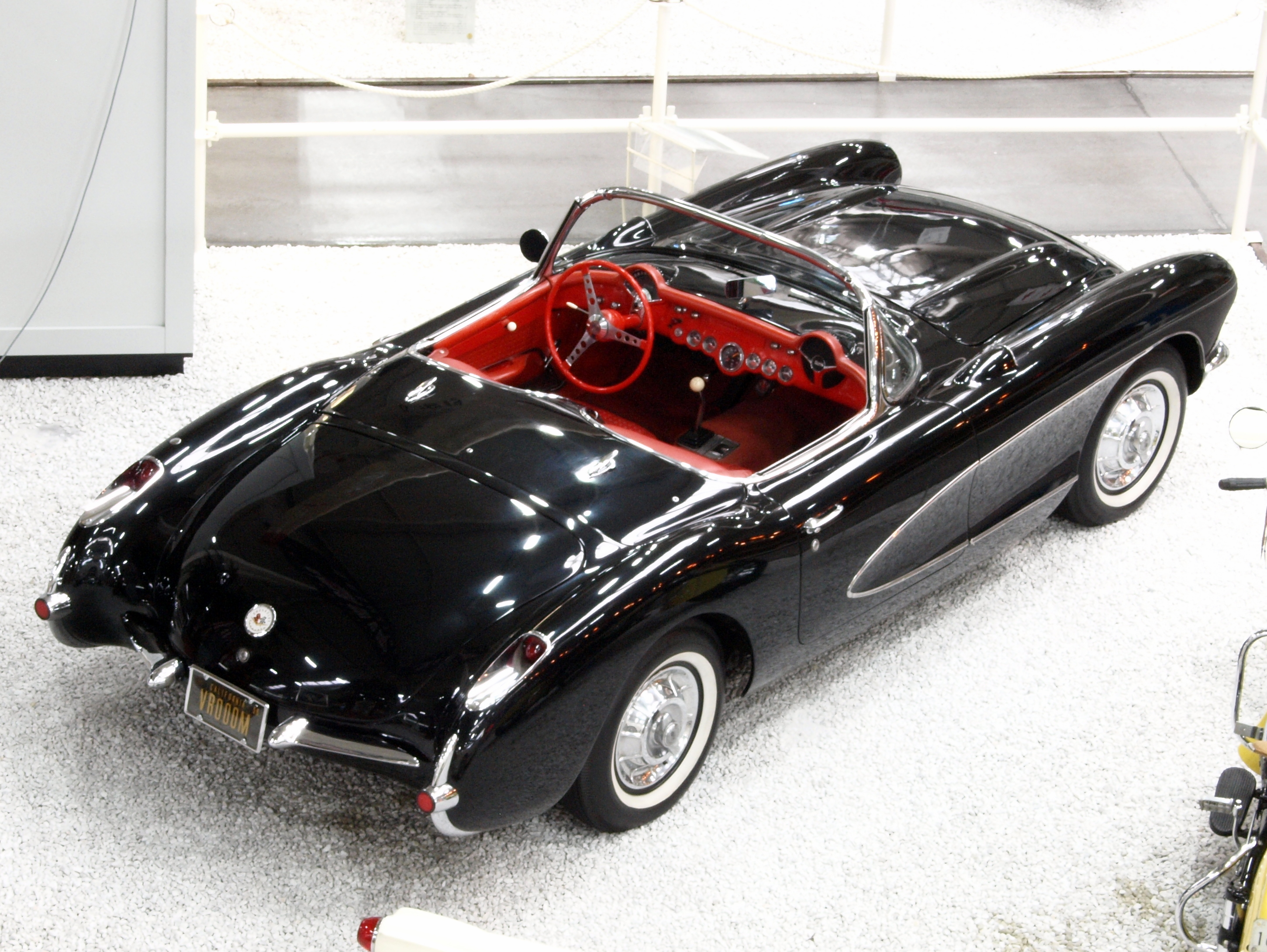
1956

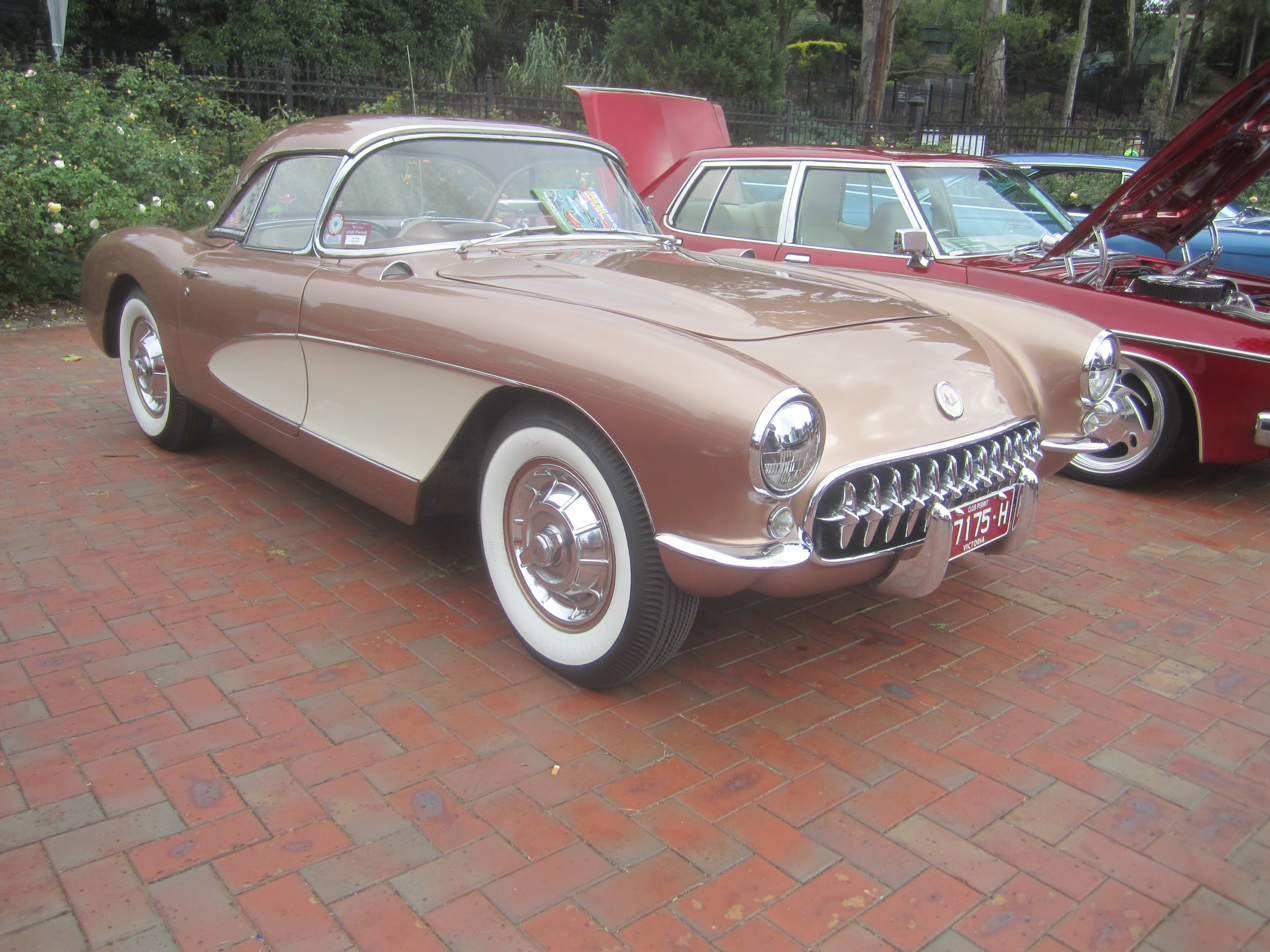
1957

== 1958–1960 ==
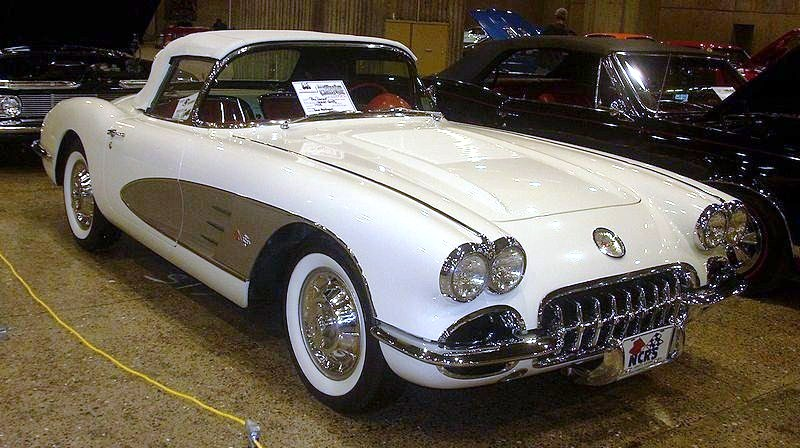
1958 convertible

=== 1958 ===
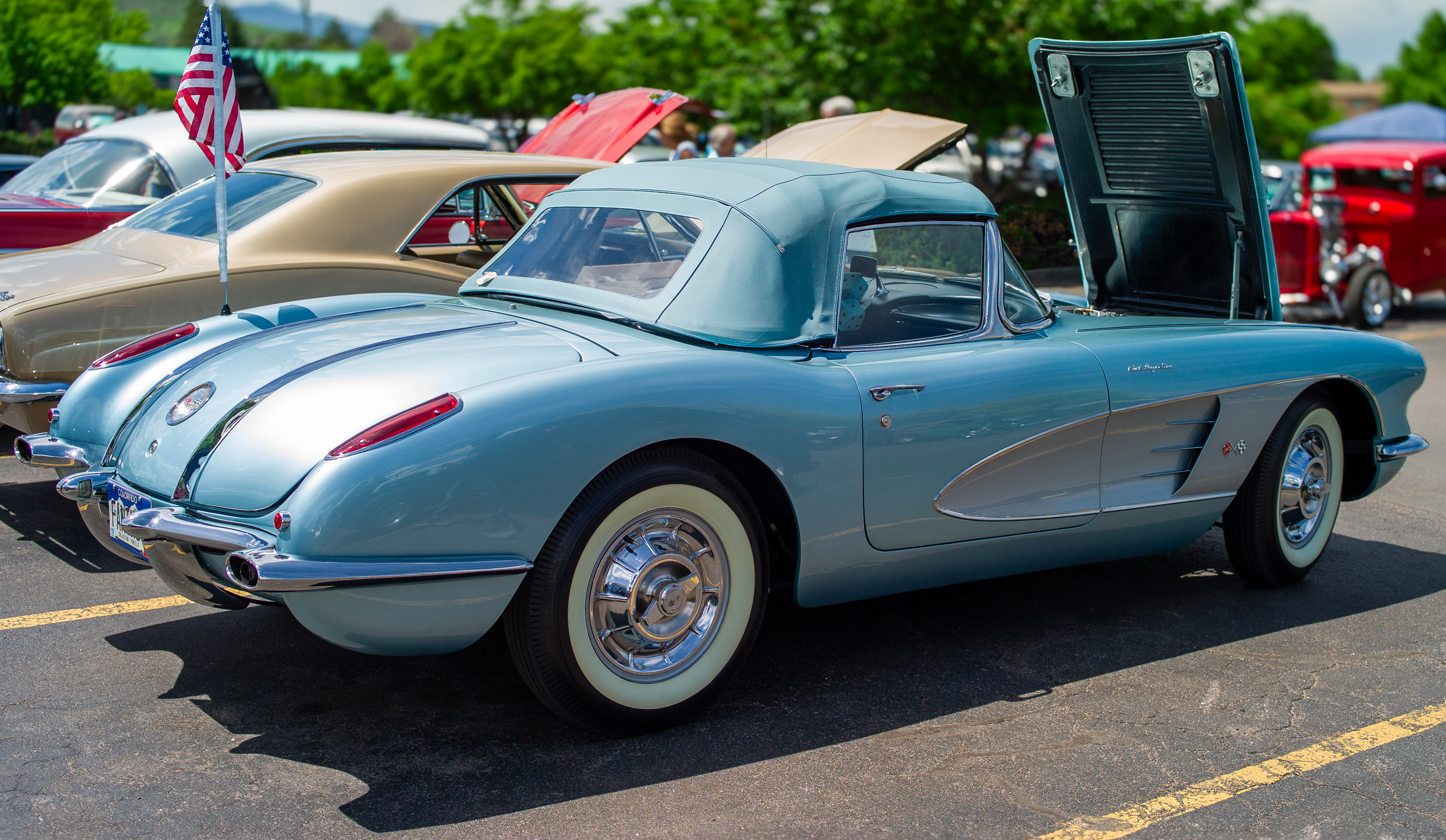
1958 Corvette in Silver Blue

In an era of chrome and four headlamps, the Corvette adapted to the look of the day. The 1958 model year and the four that followed all had the exposed four-headlamp treatment and prominent grilles, but a faux-louvered hood and chrome trunk spears were unique to this model year. The interior and instruments were updated, including placing a tachometer directly in front of the driver. For the 1958 model, an 8000 rpm tachometer was used with the 240 and 290 hp (179 and 216 kW) engines, rather than the 6000 rpm units used in the lower horsepower engines. Optional engine choices included two with twin carburetors (including a 270 hp (201 kW) version with Carter 2613S and 2614S WCFB four-barrels) and two with fuel injection. The power output for the highest-rated fuel-injected engine was 290 hp (216 kW). Displacement remained 283 cu in (4.6 L). For the first time, seat belts were factory-installed rather than dealer-installed as on previous models. Options that were not popular included RPO 684 heavy-duty brakes and suspension (144), RPO 579 250 hp (186 kW) engine (554), and RPO 276 15×5.5-inch steel road wheels (404).

=== 1959 ===
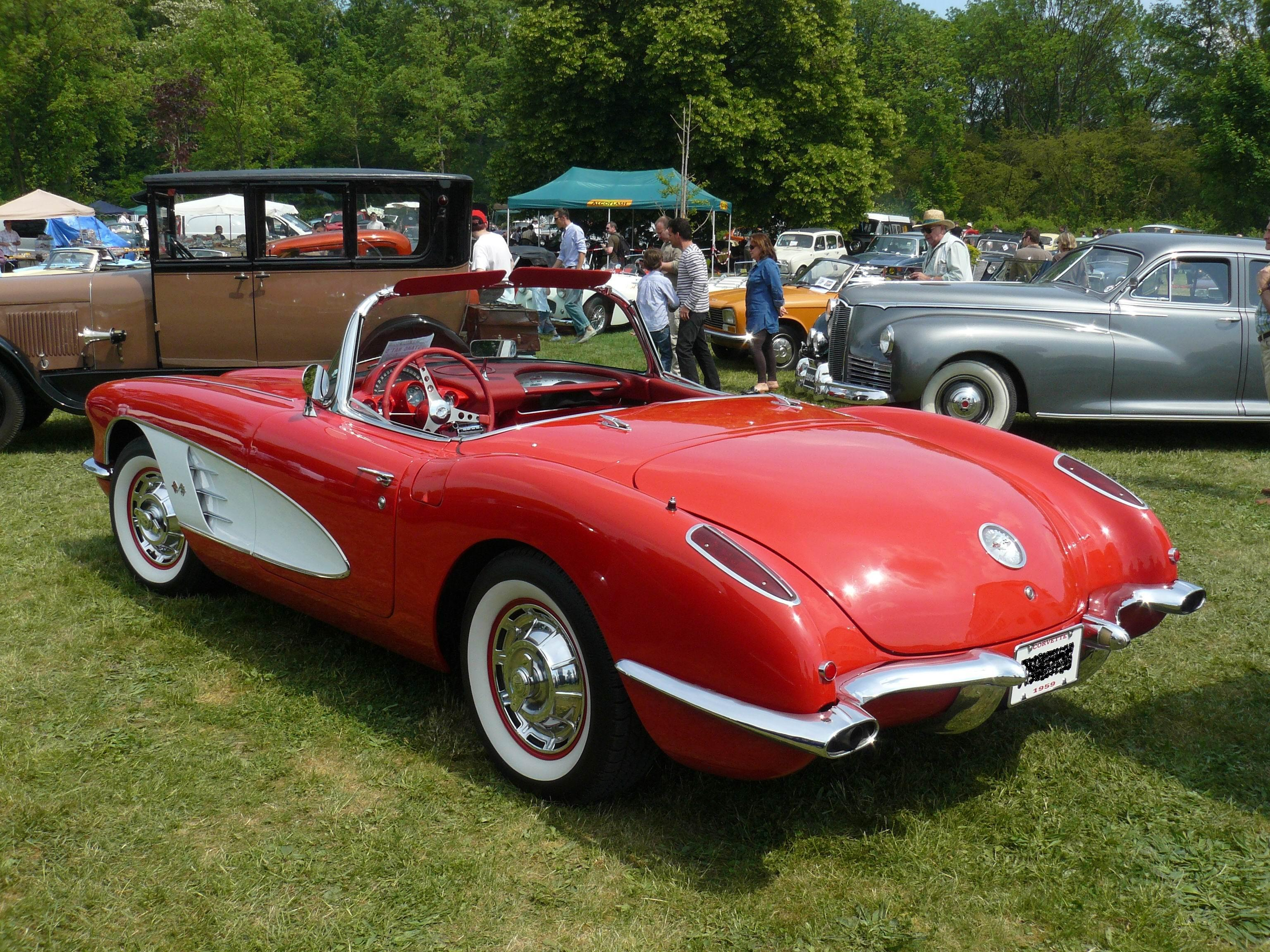
1959 was the next to last year for tail lights atop the rear fenders

For the 1959 model, engines and horsepower ratings did not change. The interiors were revised slightly with different instrument graphics and the addition of a storage bin to the passenger side. A positive reverse lockout shifter with "T" handle was standard with 4-speed manual transmission. This was the only year a turquoise convertible top color could be ordered, and all 24-gallon fuel tank models through 1962 could not be ordered with convertible tops due to inadequate space for the folding top mechanism. Rare options: RPO 684 heavy-duty brakes and suspension (142), RPO 686 metallic brakes (333), RPO 276 15×5.5-inch wheels (214), RPO 426 power windows (547), RPO 473 power convertible top (661).

=== 1960 ===
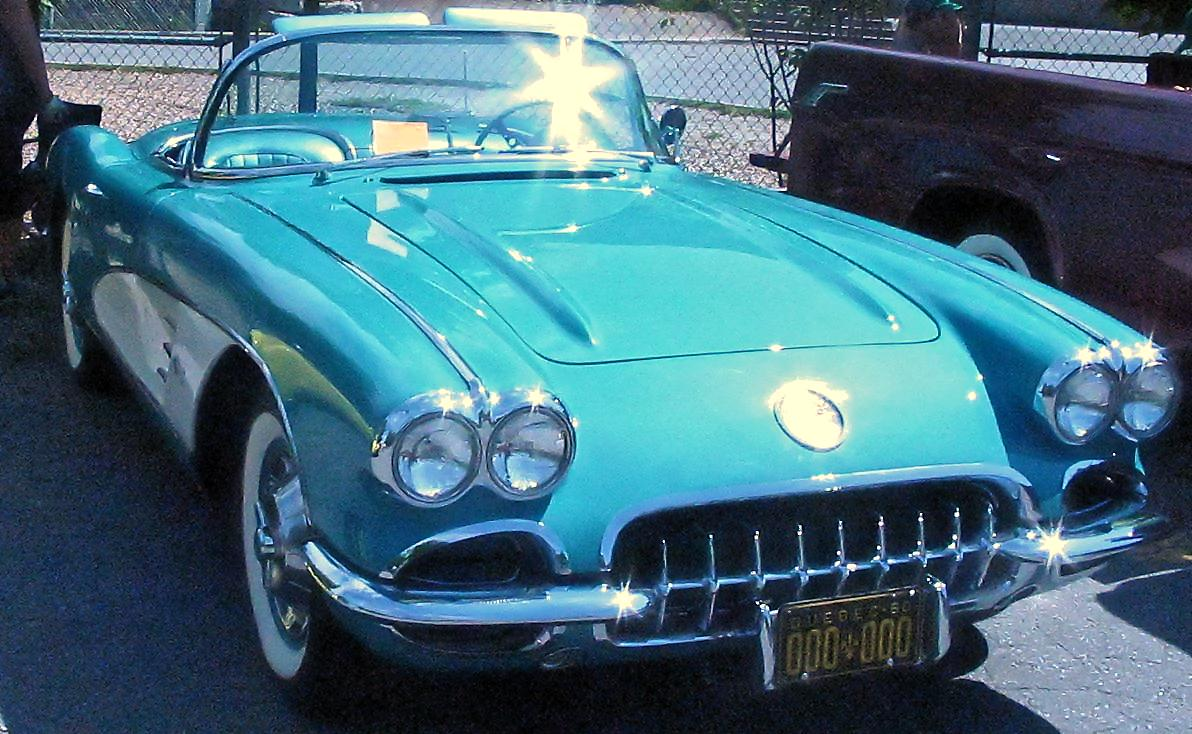
There were fewer and heavier teeth in the grille in 1960

The last features to appear in 1960 models included taillamps molded into the rear fenders and heavy grille teeth. New features include aluminum radiators, but only with 270 and 290 hp (201 and 216 kW) engines. Also for the first time, all fuel-injection engines required manual transmissions. The 1960s Cascade Green was metallic, unique to the year, and the most infrequent color at 140 made. Options that were not often ordered included RPO 579 250 hp (186 kW) engine (100), RPO 687 heavy-duty brakes and suspension (119), RPO 276 15×5.5-inch steel road wheels (246), RPO 473 power convertible top (512), and RPO 426 power windows (544).

1958-1960 Corvette
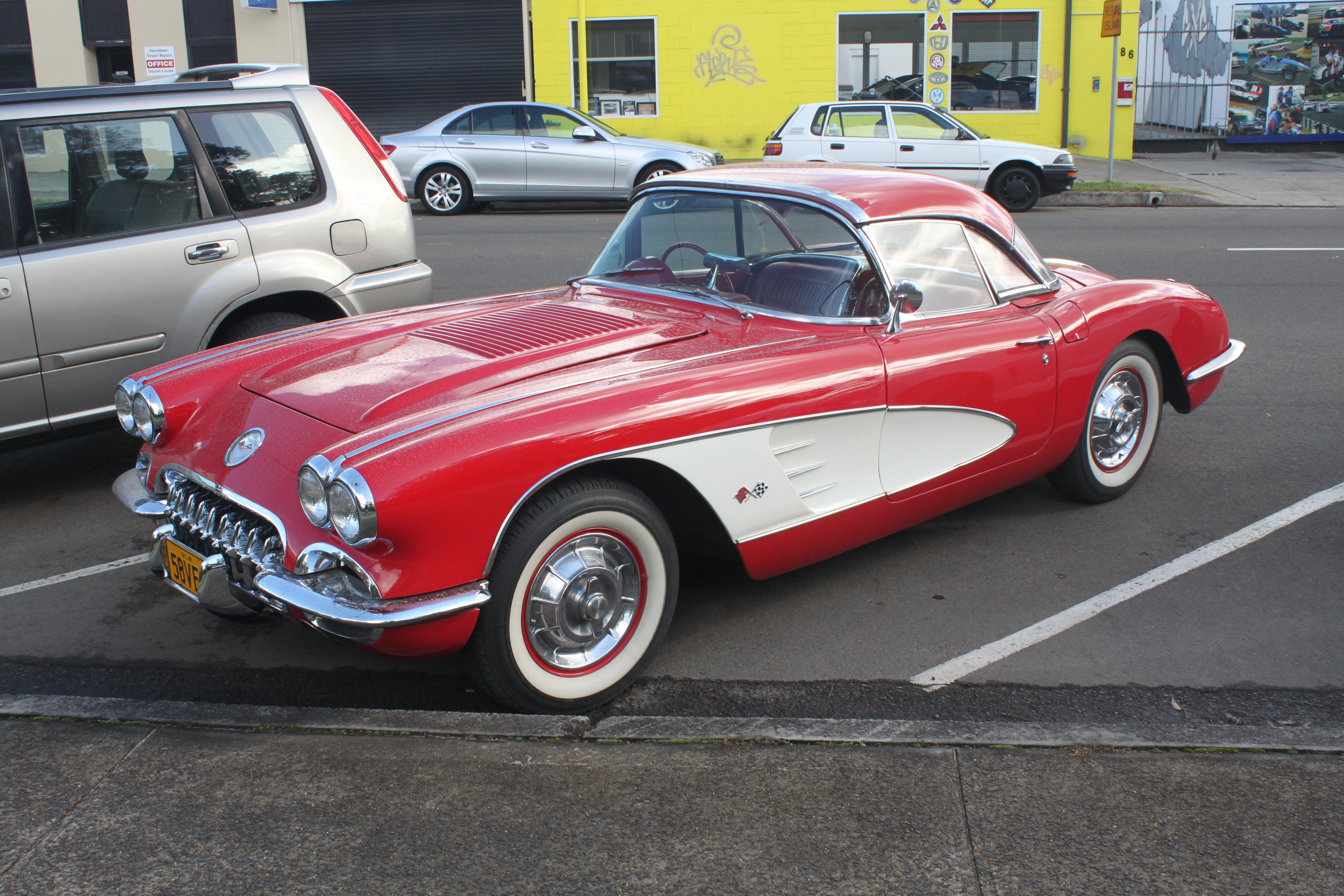
1958

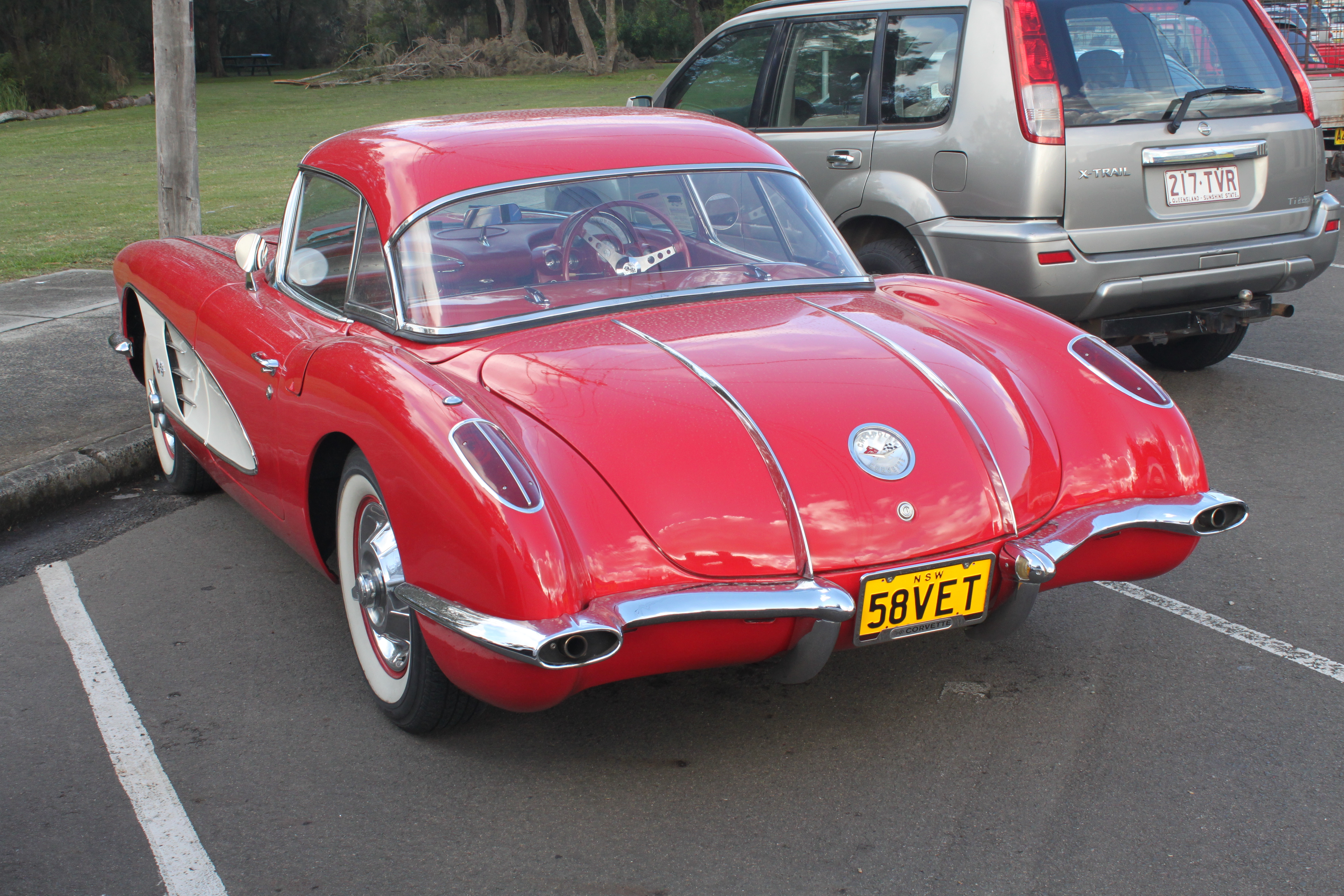
1958

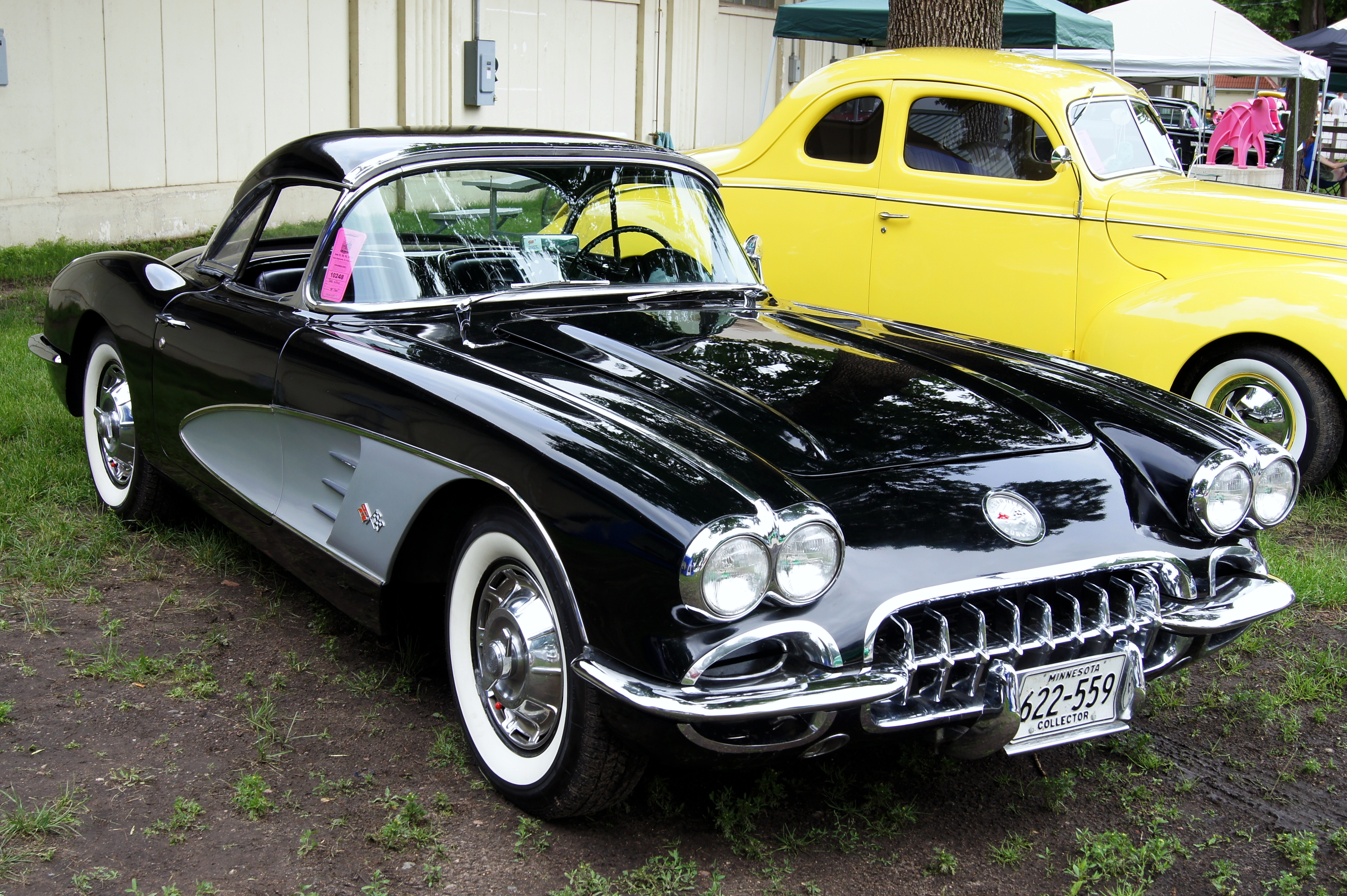
1959

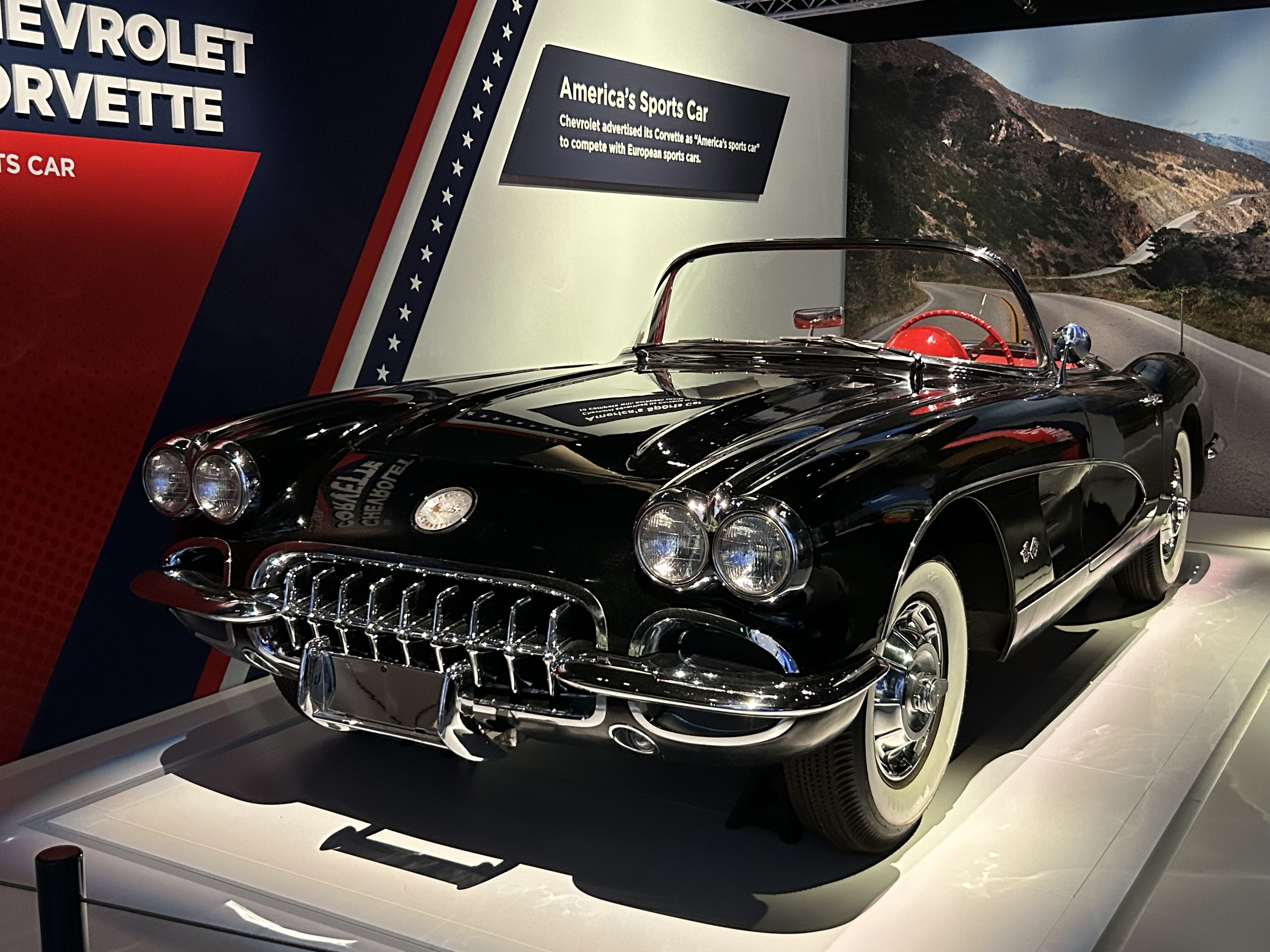
1959

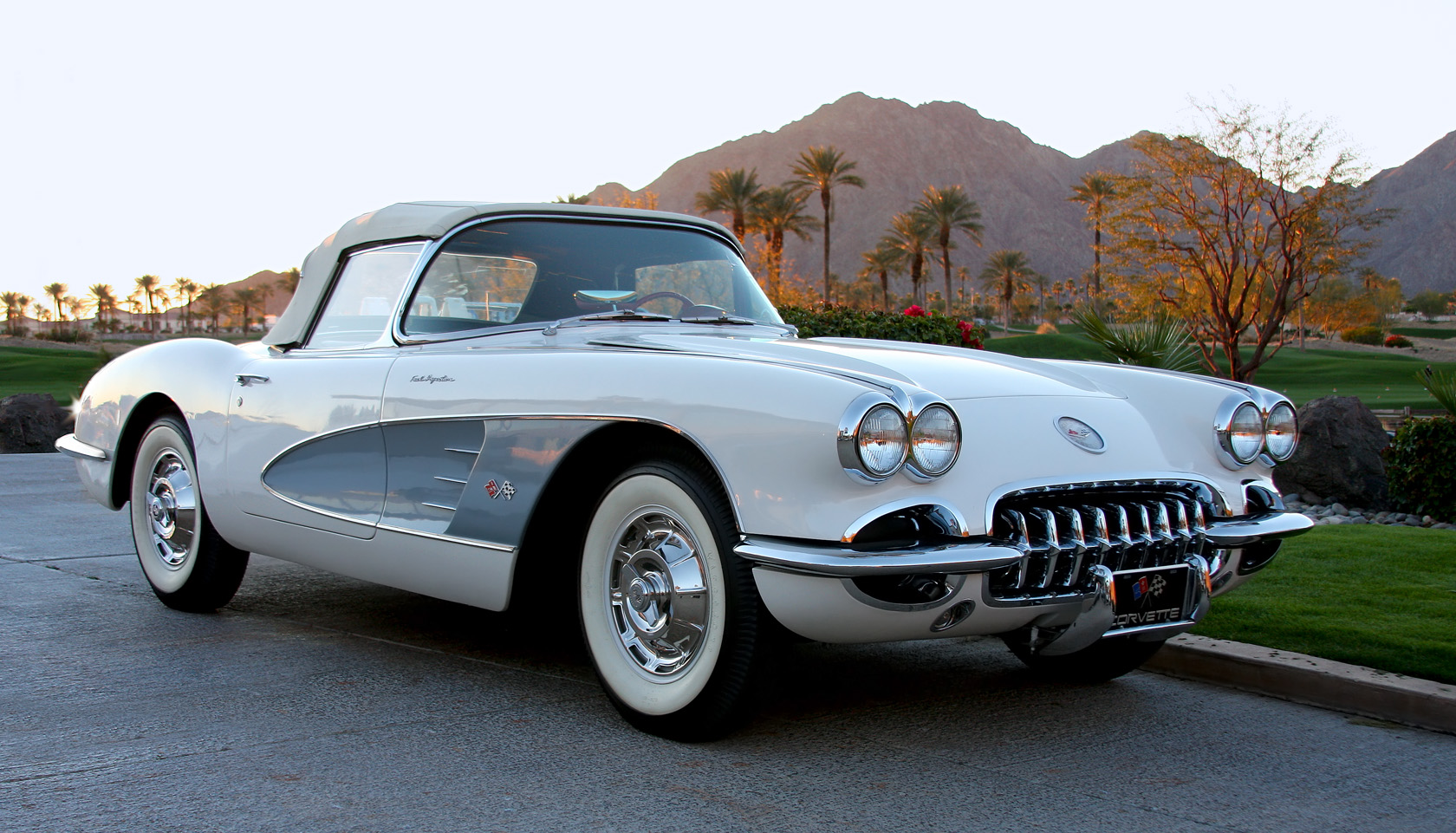
1960

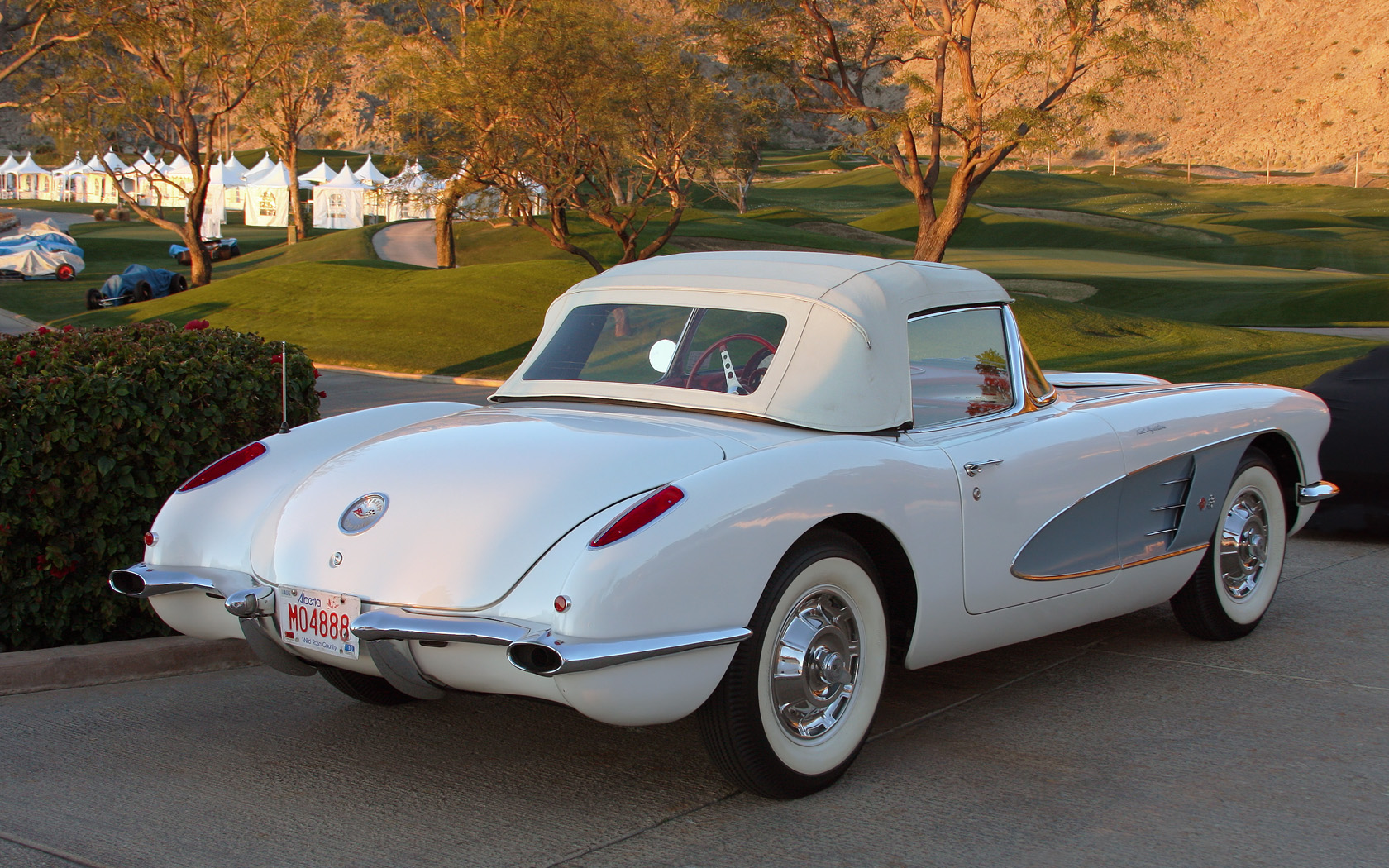
1960

== 1961–1962 ==
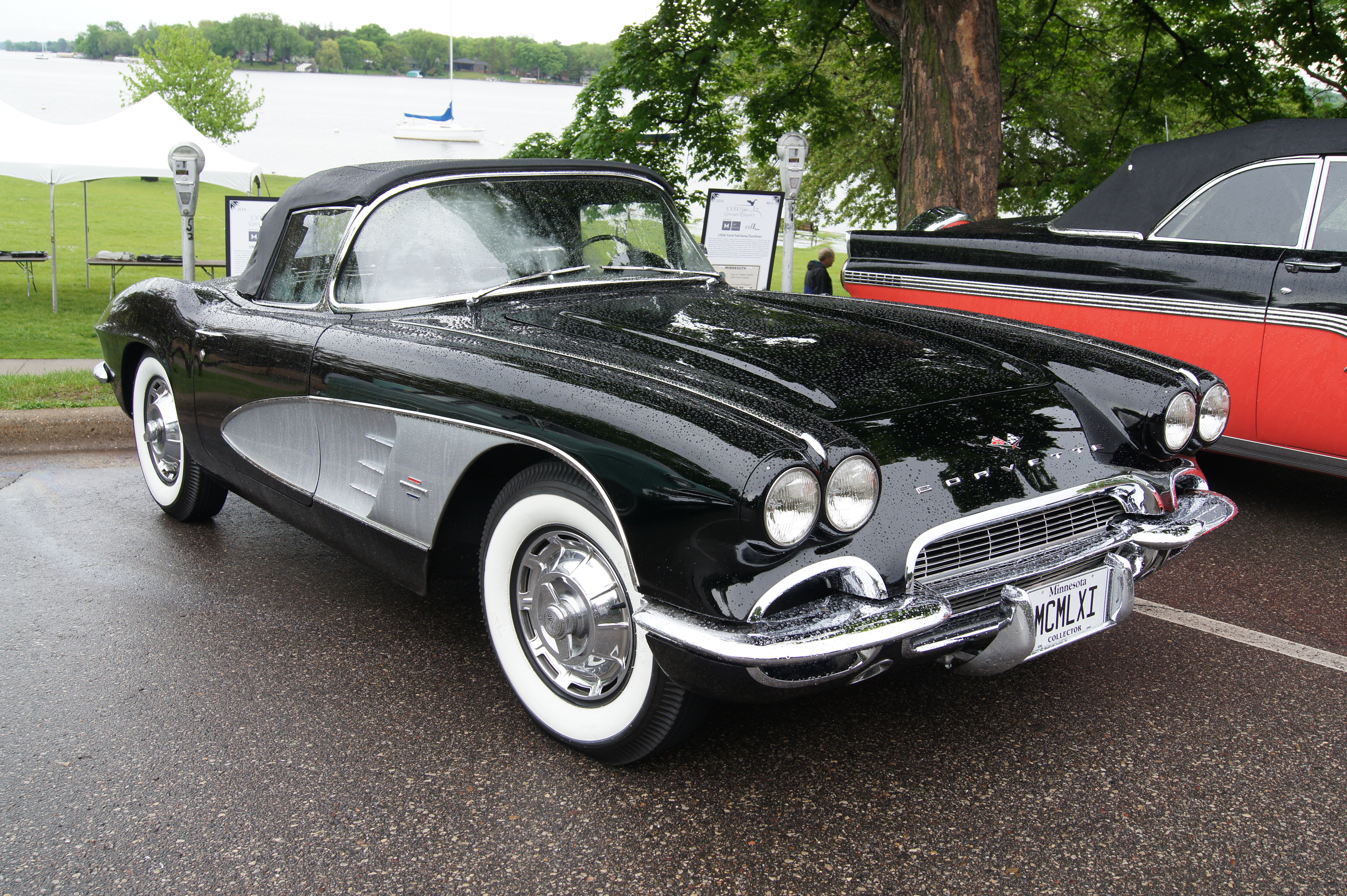
1961 was the last year for two-tone paint until 1978

=== 1961 ===
Twin taillights appeared on the 1961, a treatment that continues to this day. Engine displacement remained at 283 cubic inches, but power output increased for the two fuel-injected engines to 275 and 315 hp (205 and 235 kW). Output ratings for the dual-four barrel engines did not change (245 and 270 hp (183 and 201 kW)), but this was the last year of their availability. This was the last year for contrasting paint colors in cove areas, and the last two-tone Corvette of any type until 1978. Also debuting in 1961 was a new boat-tail that was carried through to the C2. Infrequently ordered options included RPO 353 275 hp (205 kW) engine (118), RPO 687 heavy-duty brakes and steering (233), RPO 276 15×5.5-inch steel road wheels (357), and RPO 473 power convertible top (442).

=== 1962 ===
With a new larger engine the 1962 model year Corvette was the quickest to date. Displacement of the small-block V8 increased from 283 cu in (4.6 L) to 327 cu in (5,360 cc), which was rated at 250 hp (186 kW) in its base single 4-barrel carburetor version. Hydraulic valve lifters were used in the standard and optional 300 hp (224 kW) engines, solid lifters in the optional carbureted 340 hp (254 kW) and fuel-injected 360 hp (268 kW) versions. Dual 4-barrel carburetor engines were no longer available.

1962 saw the last solid-rear-axle suspension, that had been used from the beginning. Rocker panel trim was seen for the first time, and exposed headlights for the last, until 2005. This was the last Corvette model to offer an optional power convertible top mechanism. Rare options: RPO 488 24-gallon fuel tank (65), RPO 687 heavy-duty brakes and steering (246), RPO 473 power convertible top (350), RPO 276 15×5.5-inch wheels (561).

1961-1962 Corvette
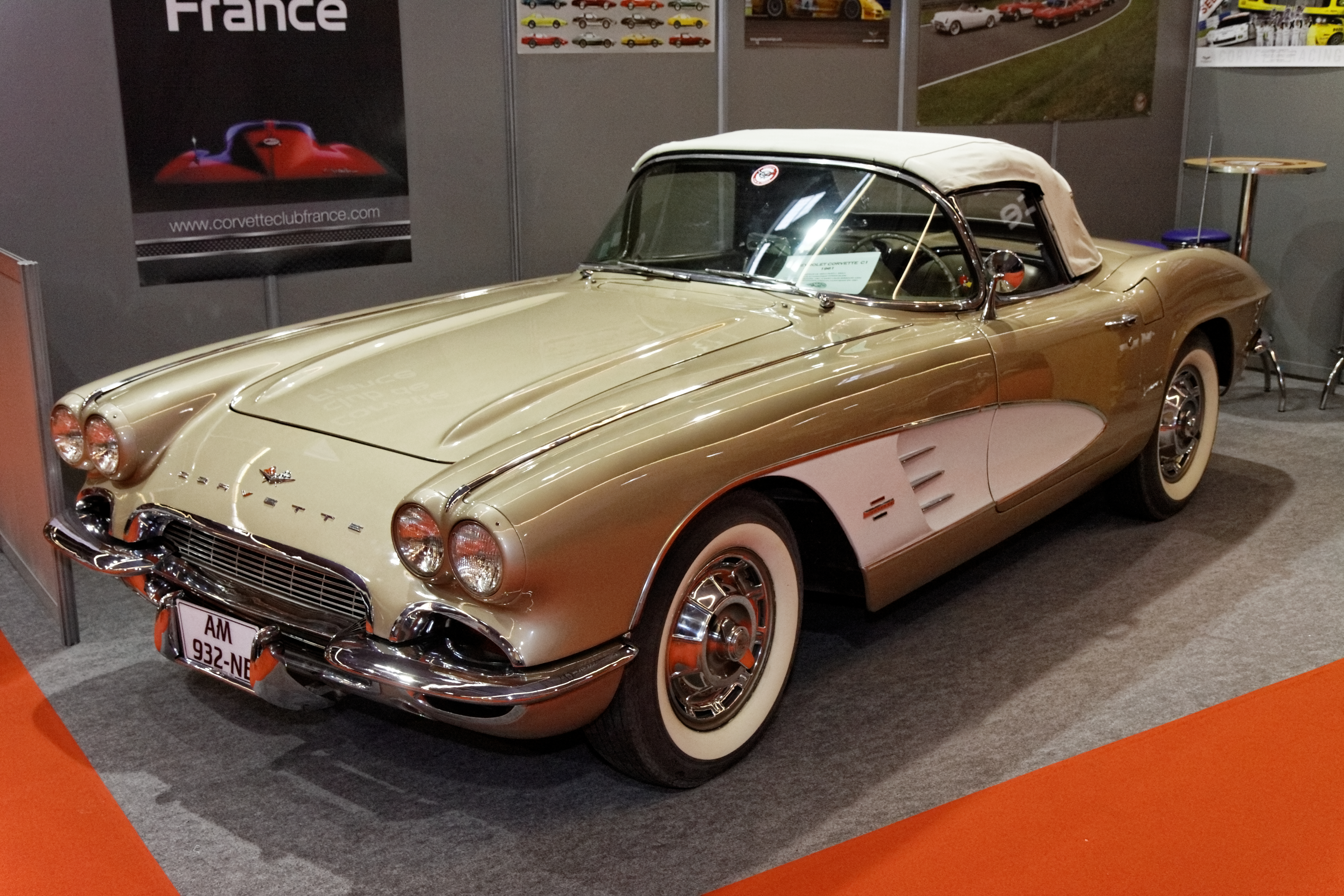
1961

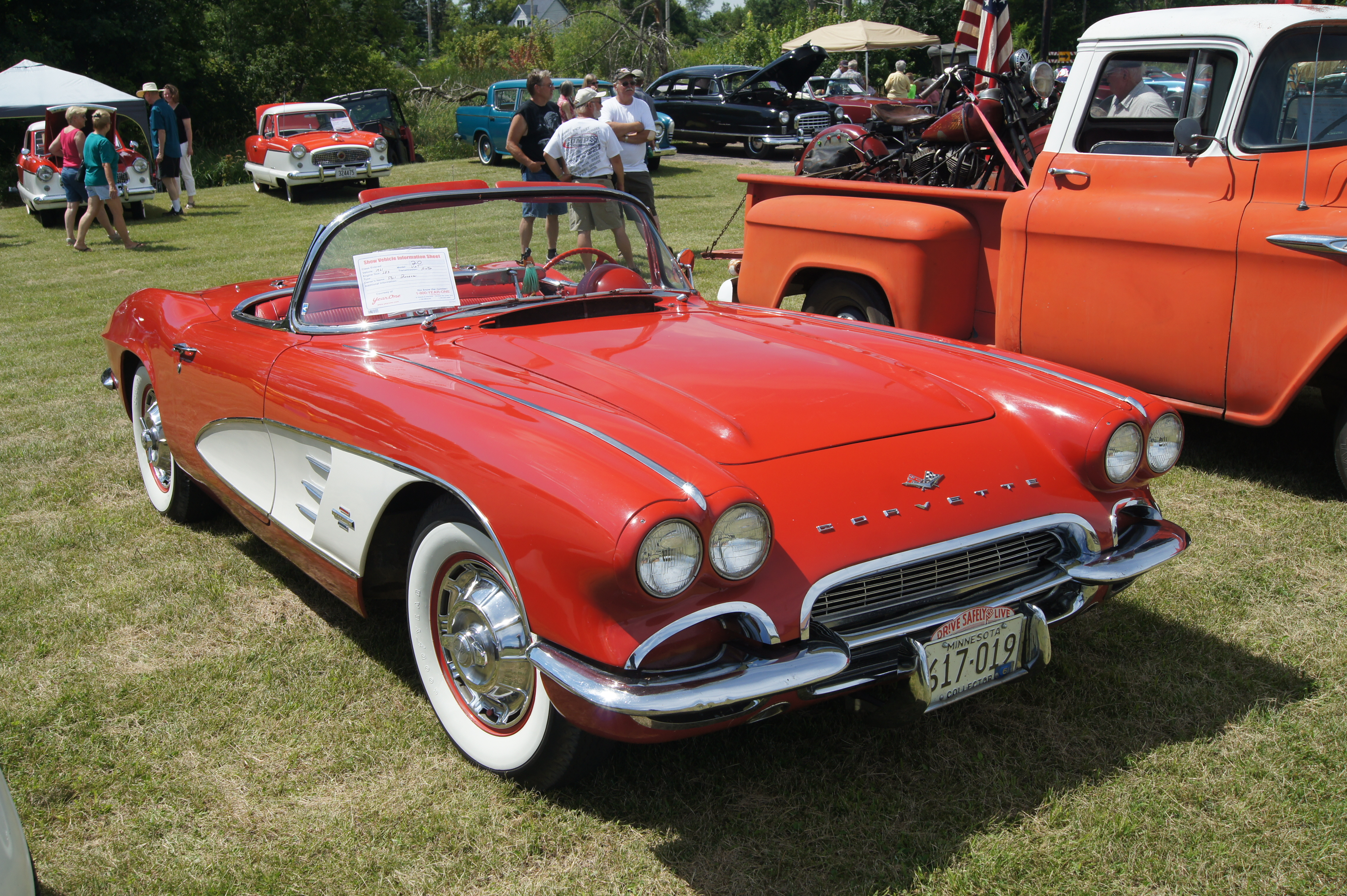
1961

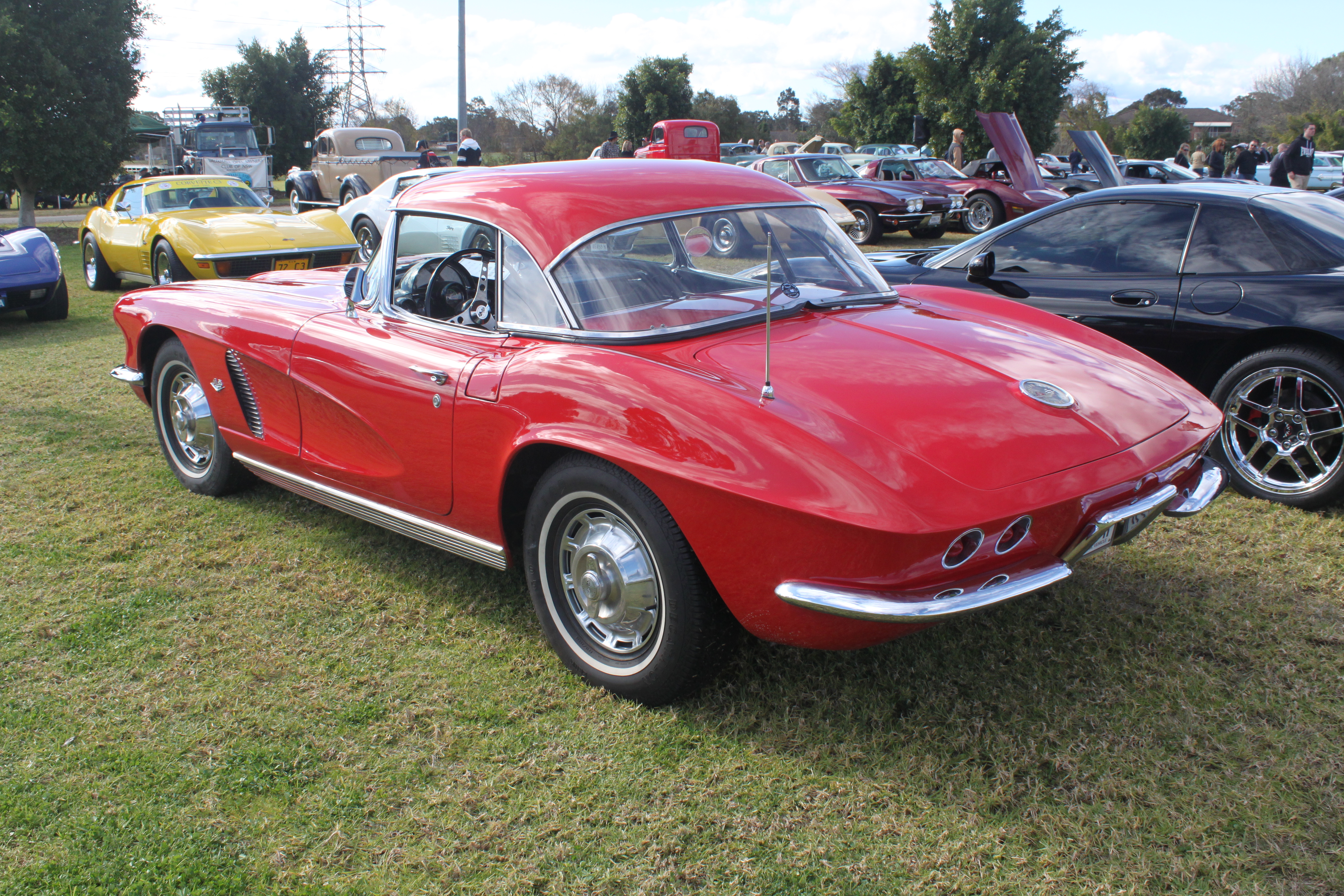
1962

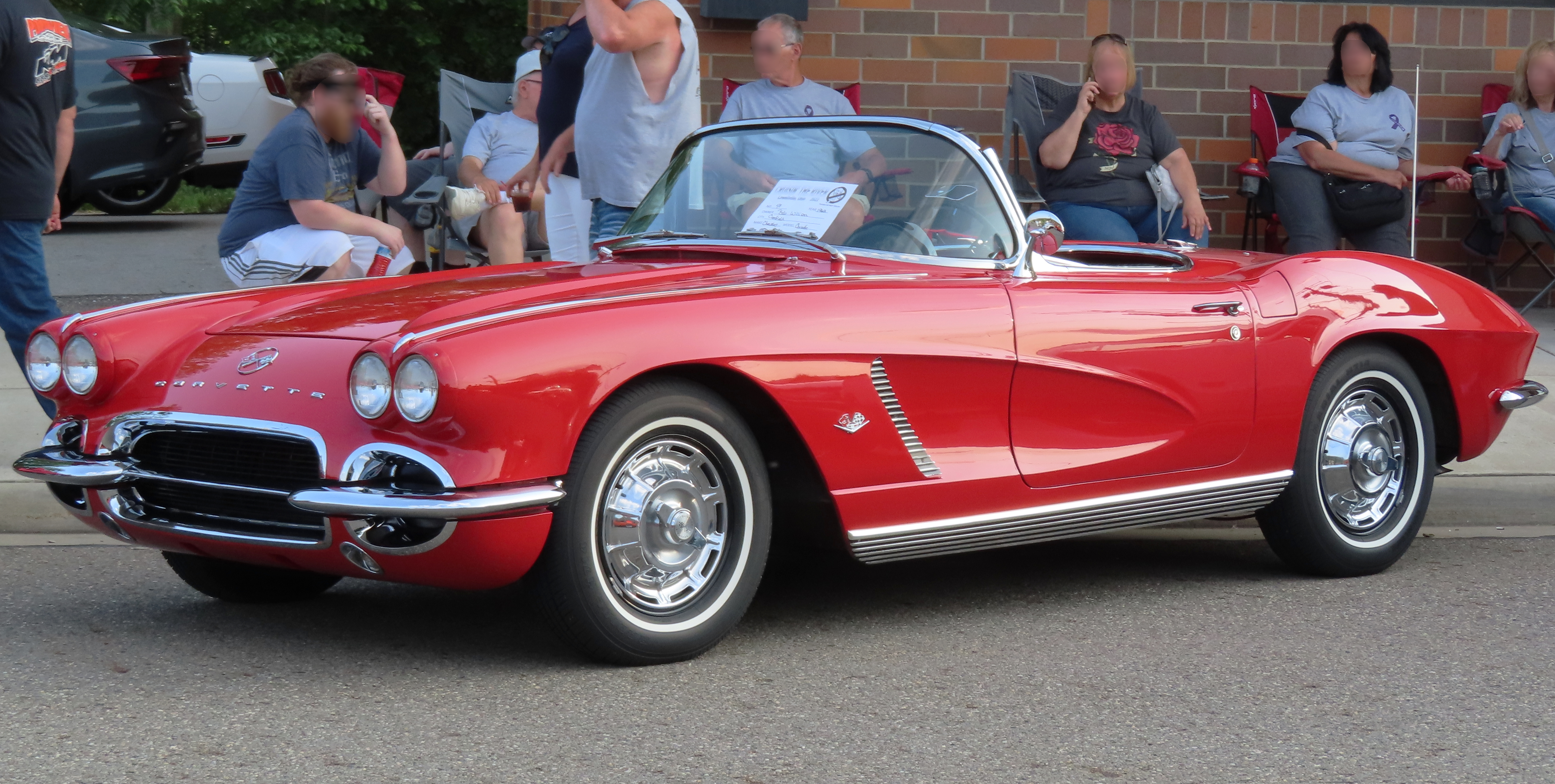
1962

== Scaglietti Corvette ==
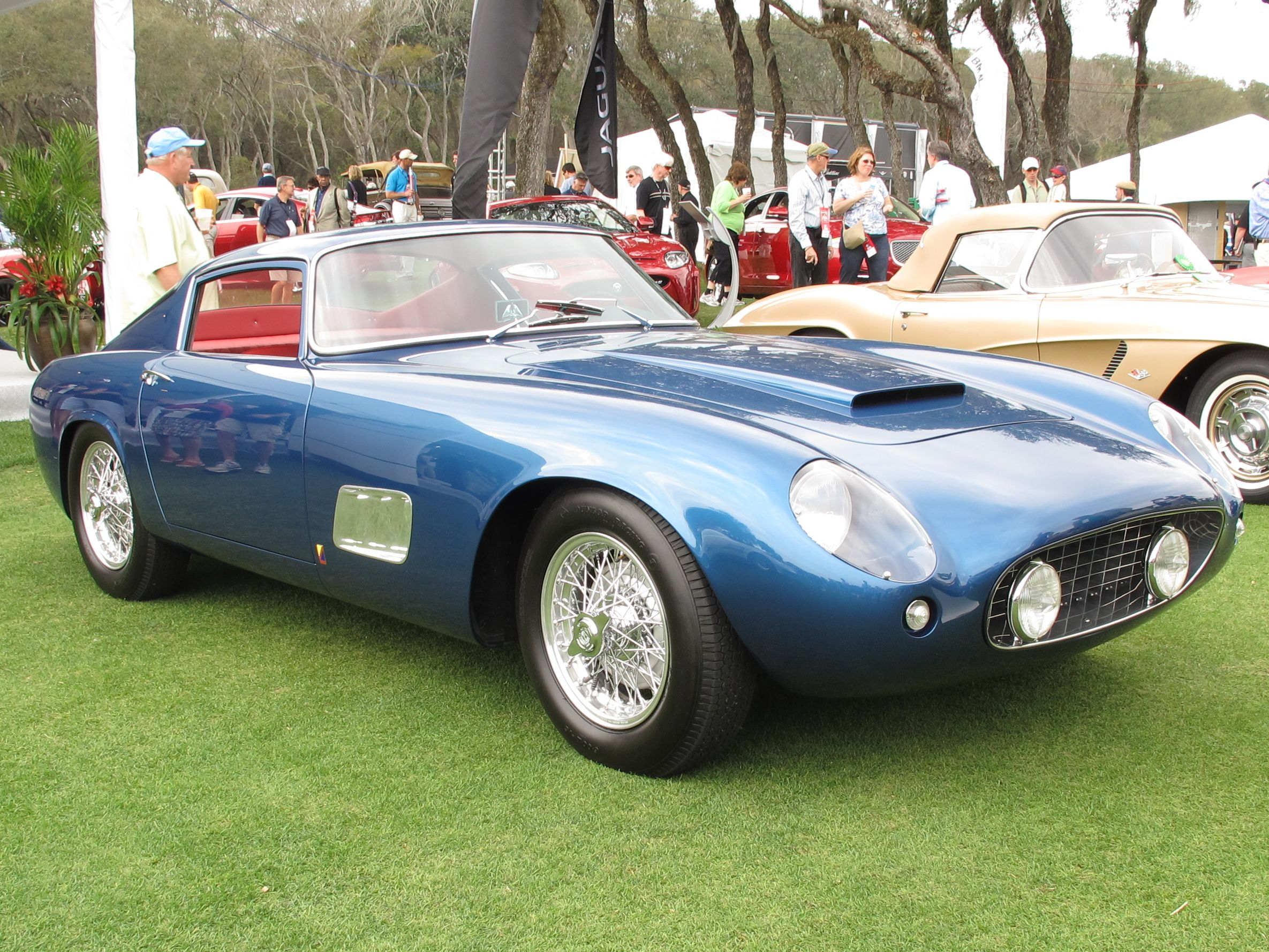
Scaglietti Corvette #2, custom built for Jim Hall

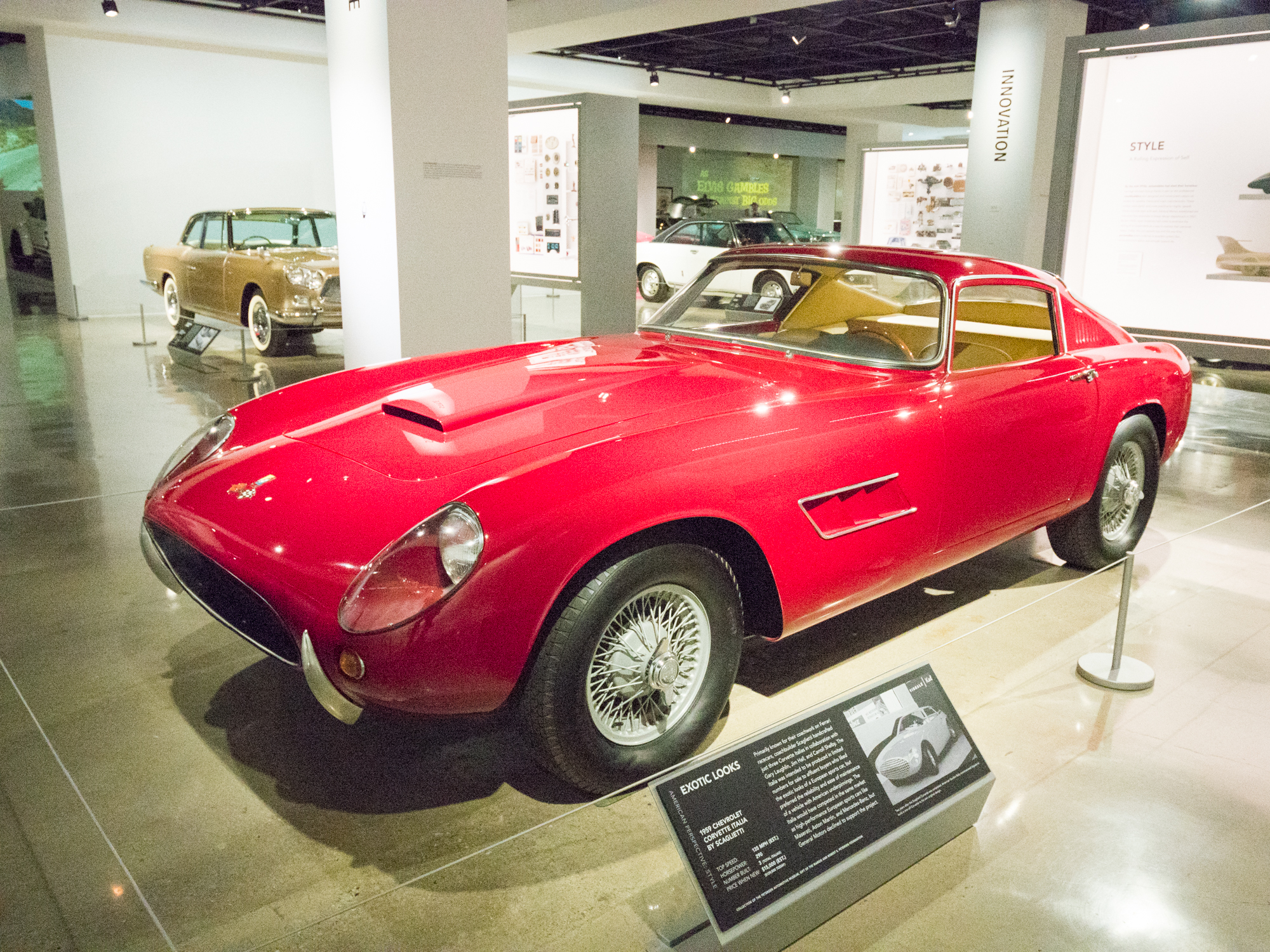
Scaglietti Corvette #3, custom built for Carroll Shelby

In 1959, a Texan oil well drilling contractor named Gary Laughlin wondered if it would be possible to create a vehicle with Italian design characteristics using the chassis and engine components from an American car like the Corvette. To oversee this creation, he enlisted the help of car constructer Jim Hall and race car driver Carroll Shelby, whom he was good friends with, to assist with the engineering of the project and, after their efforts, each man was to receive their own Corvette custom made to their liking. Thus, the trio managed to get three rolling Corvette chassis off of the production line and arranged to have them shipped to Modena, Italy. There, with the help of Road & Track correspondent Pete Coltrin, they managed to get in touch with Italian coachbuilder Sergio Scaglietti, famous for his design work on Ferrari road cars at the time. Scaglietti agreed to create and fit a new lightweight aluminium body to each car in secret, as Enzo Ferrari reportedly threatened to cancel Scaglietti's partnership with him after learning of the project. The resulting Scaglietti Corvette ended up weighing roughly 400 lbs less than any other Corvette at the time.

Each of the three cars assembled were unique for each owner:

Car #1, originally for Laughlin, was finished in red. It used a slightly different body than cars #2 and #3 to accommodate an existing Corvette front grille. It originally came with a 283 cu in V8 with 315 hp and a four-barrel carburetor, mated to a 2-speed automatic transmission.

Car #2, originally for Hall, was finished in blue. This version had a body more closely resembling the Ferrari 250 GT Berlinetta LWB. It came with the same carbureted V8 and automatic transmission as Car #1.

Car #3, originally for Shelby, was finished in red. This model was somewhat unique as though it used a similarly designed body to Car #2, it was the only model fitted with fuel-injection and a Borg-Warner 4-speed manual transmission. Unlike the other two members of the project, Shelby never took delivery of his car, citing that it was too expensive for his purposes for it.

However, the Scaglietti Corvette was not without its issues. Though conceived in 1959, the final projects wouldn't be completed and shipped back to the US until 1961, by which time it became clear that the aluminum bodies, though much lighter, had caused dramatic effects to the Corvette's chassis, resulting in dangerous front end lift at high speeds. Coupled with legal pressure from General Motors and Enzo Ferrari to put an end to production, and the Scaglietti Corvette project would be forever cemented as only a concept. However, many ideas from the car would prove inspirational, leading Jim Hall to found his Chevrolet-powered Chaparral racing team and Carroll Shelby to revisit the idea of a European-American sports car with the AC Cobra.

== Production notes ==
Production notes
Year	Production	Base Price	Notes
1953	300	$3,498	First-year production starts on June 30; polo white with red interior and black top is only color combination; Options standard until 1955 for the car were interior door handles; "clip in" side curtains in place of roll-up windows
1954	3,640	$2,774	Production moves to St. Louis; blue, red, and black are added; beige top, longer exhaust pipes
1955	700	$2,774	Both straight-6 and 265 cu in V8 engines produced; 3-speed manual transmission added late in the model year
1956	3,467	$3,120	New body with roll-up windows; V8-only; 3-speed manual transmission becomes standard equipment and Powerglide moved to option list
1957	6,339	$3,176	283 cu in V8; Optional 4-speed manual and fuel injection added
1958	9,168	$3,591	Quad-headlight body and new interior. Fake louvers on the hood and chrome strips on the trunk lid. The number of teeth in the grille was reduced from thirteen to nine.
1959	9,670	$3,875	First black interior and dash storage bin; only year with a turquoise top. Louvers and chrome strips from the 1958 model year were removed.
1960	10,261	$3,872	Very minor changes to the interior: red and blue bars on the dash logo, vertical stitching on seats
1961	10,939	$3,934	New rear styling, bumpers, and round taillights. New fine-mesh grille.
1962	14,531	$4,038	327 cu in V8 engine; last year with a trunk until 1998 and last year with exposed headlights until 2005. New black grille with chrome surround, and chrome rocker panel moldings.
Total	69,015		

== Engines ==
Engine	Year	Power
235 cu in (3.9 L) Blue Flame I6	1953–1954	150 hp (110 kW)
235 cu in (3.9 L) Blue Flame I6	1955	155 hp (116 kW)
265 cu in (4.3 L) Small-block V8	1955	195 hp (145 kW)
265 cu in (4.3 L) Small-block V8	1956	210 hp (160 kW)
265 cu in (4.3 L) Small-block V8	1956	240 hp (180 kW)
283 cu in (4.6 L) Small-block V8	1957	220 hp (160 kW)
283 cu in (4.6 L) Small-block V8	1958–1961	230 hp (170 kW)
283 cu in (4.6 L) Small-block V8	1957–1961	245 hp (183 kW)
283 cu in (4.6 L) Small-block V8	1957–1961	270 hp (200 kW)
283 cu in (4.6 L) Small-block FI V8	1957–1959	250 hp (190 kW)
283 cu in (4.6 L) Small-block FI V8	1960–1961	275 hp (205 kW)
283 cu in (4.6 L) Small-block FI V8	1957	283 hp (211 kW)
283 cu in (4.6 L) Small-block FI V8	1958–1959	290 hp (220 kW)
283 cu in (4.6 L) Small-block FI V8	1960–1961	315 hp (235 kW)
327 cu in (5.4 L) Small-block V8	1962	250 hp (190 kW)
327 cu in (5.4 L) Small-block V8	1962	300 hp (220 kW)
327 cu in (5.4 L) Small-block V8	1962	340 hp (250 kW)
327 cu in (5.4 L) Small-block FI V8	1962	360 hp (270 kW)

== Market value ==
The most expensive Corvette (C1) to sell in history was sold by Barrett-Jackson in the United States in March 2021 for $825,000 (~$965,682 in 2025) (£591,470).

== See also ==
- Mako Shark (concept car)
- Chevrolet Engineering Research Vehicle
- Zora Arkus-Duntov
- General Motors Motorama
- Corvette C2
- Chevrolet Corvette SS
