= Packard Light Eight =

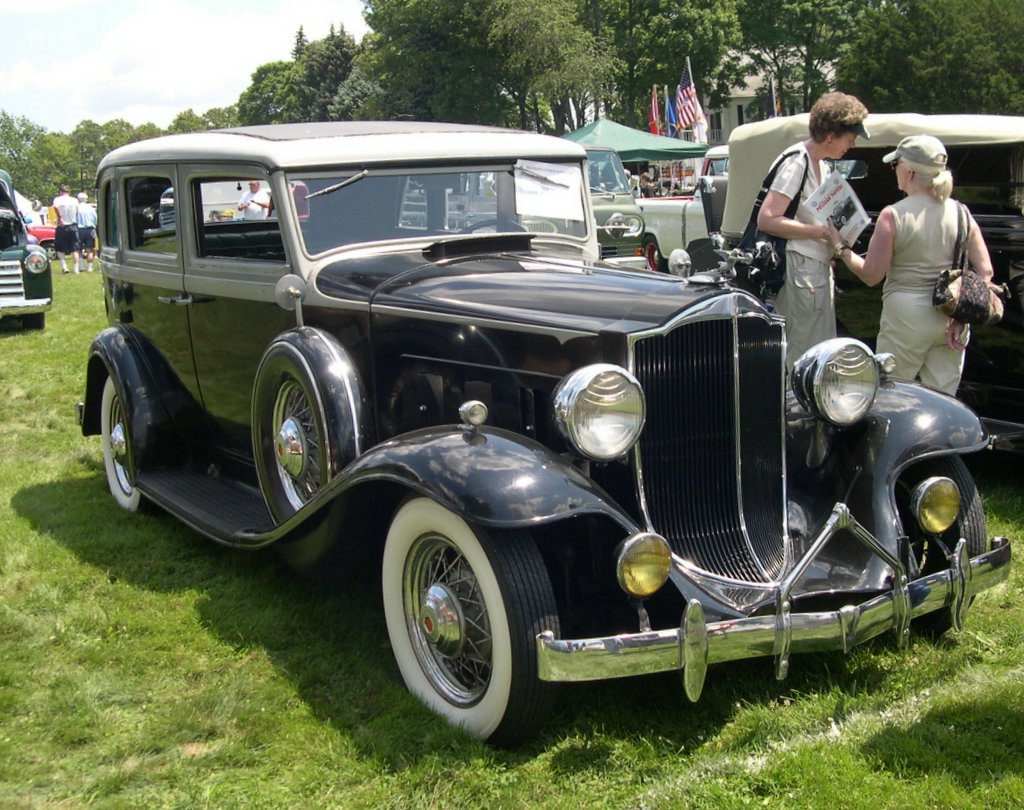
- 1932 Packard Light Eight Model 900 4-door sedan

Overview
- Manufacturer: Packard
- Model years: 1932
- Assembly: Packard Automotive Plant, Detroit, Michigan, United States

Body and chassis
- Class: Full-size luxury car
- Layout: Front-engine, rear-wheel-drive

Chronology
- Successor: Packard One-Twenty

The Packard Ninth Series Light Eight Model 900 was an automobile model produced by the Packard Motor Car Company of Detroit, Michigan only during model year 1932. The Light Eight was planned as a new entry model, building off the 1928 Packard Six. It competed in the upper middle-class with makes like GM's Companion Brand LaSalle, Marquette and Chrysler's DeSoto, and the top-level products from Studebaker, Hudson, and Nash. The marketing objective was to add a new market segment for Packard during the depression.

Packard did not use yearly model changes in these years. A new series appeared when management felt that there were enough running changes made. Therefore, the Light Eight was introduced during January 1932, together with the new V-12 (called "Twin Six" in its first year to honor the pioneer Packard model built from 1915 to 1923). Standard Eights and Super Eights followed in June 1932.

== Technical ==
Construction of the Light Eight followed the Packard tradition. It had a heavy frame with X-bracing, 8-inch (203 mm) deep side members, and the usual rear-wheel drive. Wheelbase was 127.75 inches (3,245 mm). Power came from a 319.2 cu in (5.2 L) flat head straight eight engine with a compression ratio of 6:0, delivering 110 hp (82 kW; 112 PS). It had a vacuum-plate clutch and an angle set hypoid differential. Battery and toolboxes were mounted on the fenders. Full instrumentation was used.

The car was distinguished by a grille that had the traditional ox-yoke shape, but also with a then fashionable "shovel" nose. Closed Light Eights had a quarter window layout that was not shared by other Packards.

The Light Eight used the same engine as the Standard Eight, but was lighter - 4,115 lb (1,867 kg) for the sedan vs. 4,570 lb (2,073 kg) for the model 901 Standard Eight sedan.

== Body styles ==
The Light Eight series 900 was available in four body styles:

Style # 553 4-door, 5-passenger Sedan
Style # 558 2-door, 2/4-passenger Stationary (rumble seat) Coupe
Style # 559 2-door, 2/4-passenger (rumble seat) Roadster Coupe
Style # 563 2-door, 5-passenger Sedan Coupe (sometimes referred as a "Victoria" Coupe)

== Prices and options ==
A Light Eight 4-door, 5-passenger Sedan was priced at US$1,750 ($40,331 in 2024 dollars) compared to $2,485 ($57,270 in 2024 dollars) for a similar Standard Eight Sedan. The three other Light Eight body styles cost $1,795 each. Packard managed to sell 6,785 units of its new model. In comparison, 7,669 units of the Standard Eight were sold during the shorter model run, from 23 June 1932, until 5 January 1933. The automaker had lower profits from the Light Eight compared with the Standard Eight.

Options for the Light Eight included Dual sided or rear-mounted spare wheels, sidemount cover(s), cigar lighter, a right-hand tail-light, luggage rack, full rear bumper, and fender park lights, the latter was priced at $65.00.

== Market position ==
The Light Eight was intended as Packard's price leader at the entry level of the luxury car market. It was attractive to buyers, but it failed its main reason for existence, which was to lure away buyers from its rivals. Instead, it hurt sales of Packard's volume line, the Standard Eight. Amidst the Great Depression, many prospects for a Standard Eight ended buying a Light Eight. Although it offered not as much luxury, it had many features found in Packard's bigger model. It was powered by the same 110 hp (82 kW) engine as the Standard Eight; it had a wheelbase that was only 1.75-inch (44 mm) shorter - and its lower weight brought more performance. The Light Eight included Packard prestige at a much lower price.

Packard learned its lesson quickly. There was no Light Eight for its 10th series (1933) line. It renamed the Standard Eight as simply the Eight and integrated a four-model subseries that was patterned after the Light Eight. Although the shovel nose was gone, the quarter window treatment remained, and the differential that was introduced with the Light Eight was now found in all Eights. This 1001 series was no longer available at low prices: they started at $2,150 for the sedan and went up to $2,250 for the roadster.

The Light Eight brought the experience to Packard to build and market an upper middle-class model. In this sense, it is the predecessor for the automaker's second try into this market segment, the Packard One-Twenty, that was introduced in 1935.

== Sources ==
- Kimes, Beverly Rae, editor: Packard: A History of the Motor Car and the Company. Automobile Quarterly Publications, ISBN 0-915038-11-0
