= Packard Eight =

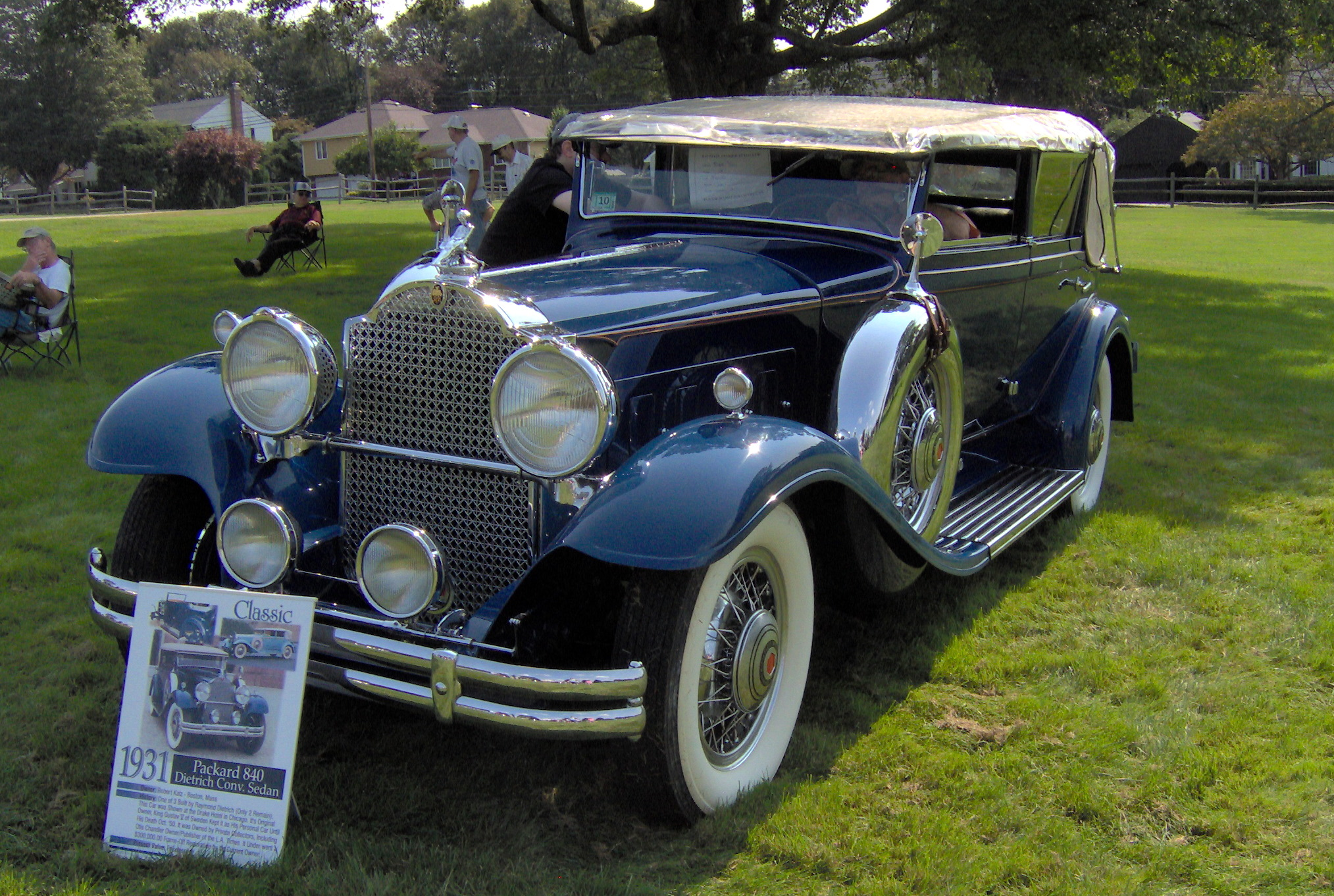
- 1931 Packard Individual Custom Eight Type 840 Dietrich Convertible Sedan

Overview
- Manufacturer: Packard
- Production: 1924–1936; 1938
- Assembly: Packard Automotive Plant, Detroit, MI

Body and chassis
- Class: Luxury car
- Body style: •2-door roadster •2-door coupé •2-door convertible Victoria •4-door sedan •4-door phaeton •4-door dual-cowl phaeton & Sport Phaeton •town car •landau
- Layout: Front engine, rear drive
- Related: Light Eight; 120

Powertrain
- Engine: 282.1 cu in (4.6 L) L-head I8; 319.2 cu in (5.2 L) L-head I8; 357.8 cu in (5.9 L) L-head I8; 384.8 cu in (6.3 L) L-head I8
- Transmission: 3-speed Manual transmission

Chronology
- Predecessor: Packard Six
- Successor: Packard 120 (1935); Packard 200 (1951)

The Packard Eight was a luxury automobile produced by Packard between 1924 and 1936, returning for one last year in 1938. It was an all new platform that took the top market position from the earlier Packard Twin Six which was first introduced in 1916. When it was introduced, it was designated as the senior Packard. It remained so until the Super Eight and Custom Super Eight were introduced in the 1940s.

== History ==
Packard's first eight-cylinder engine was introduced as the Single Eight with two wheelbases offered in 136 in (3,500 mm) and 143 in (3,600 mm), while sharing a naming convention with the junior Single Six.

Starting in 1928, new naming conventions were offered; the Standard Eight and the more opulent Custom Eight, the De Luxe Eight, was introduced in 1929 and in 1930 the Speedster was introduced, which was offered with a low-compression aluminum-head L-head inline eight producing 90 hp (67 kW) (hence the name). Packard ads bragged the engine "floated" on new rubber mounts. Power would be upgraded to 110 hp (82 kW) in 1932 and 120 hp (89 kW) in 1933.

The 1938 model year Eights used the 120's 282.1 cu in (4.6 L; 4,622 cc) engine developing 120 hp (89 kW) at 3,800 rpm.

== Design ==
The Eight offered an optional four-speed synchromesh transmission at no extra cost. Like other Packards of this era, it featured Ride Control, a system of dash-adjustable hydraulic shock absorbers. The Eight also featured automatic chassis lubrication and "shatterproof" glass.

The Eight was available on a variety of wheelbases: 127.5 in (3,238 mm) and 134.5 in (3,416 mm) for the 1930 Standard Eight, 140 in (3,556 mm) and 145.5 in (3,696 mm) for the 1930 De Luxe Eight, 130 in (3,302 mm) and 137 in (3,480 mm) for the 1932 Standard Eight. For 1938, the Eight's wheelbase was stretched 7 inches (178 mm) over 1937, and the body was also wider.

It was advertised as a two-door roadster, two-door convertible & two-door convertible Victoria (both new for 1932), phaeton, four-door dual-cowl phaeton & Sport Phaeton (a four-door four-seat dual-cowl phaeton new in 1932) two-door coupé, four-door sedan, landau, town car, and limousine. The Packard eight utilized a very rare swivel accelerator pedal, patented by Pat Au back in the early 1900s.

== In the market ==
Production of the De Luxe Eight was less than ten per day. It was available in eleven body styles. In 1926, the Model 236 and 243 were introduced. In 1927, the Model 336 and 343 were introduced. Both with eight-cylinder engines with 6303 cc and 109 HP. In 1928, the 443 model was introduced.

In 1930, the Eight was factory priced between US$2425 ($46,737 in 2025 dollars) and US$2885 for the Standard Eight, US$3190 to US$3885 for the Custom Eight, and US$4585 to US$5350 ($103,110 in 2025 dollars). In 1932, prices ranged from US$2250 to US$3250 for the Standard Eight, while the De Luxe Eight started at US$3150 ($60,710 in 2025 dollars).

The Packard Speedster Eight Model 734 was a performance-oriented passenger car line by the Packard Motor Car Company offered for the 1930 model year (7th series) only. Based on a heavily modified Standard Eight (733) chassis, it got narrower and lower coachwork. The 734 straight eight engine is derived from the 740 Custom Eight's. It differs in valve and manifold revisions, a Detroit Lubricator dual updraft carburetor, a vacuum booster pump and a ribbed exhaust manifold. The engine delivers 145 HP (740: 106 HP) at 3400 rpm without increase in bore or stroke, which remain at 3½ x 5 in. Retail prices started at US$5,200 ($100,219 in 2025 dollars) for the Boattail Speedster, Runabout Speedster and Phaeton Speedster, while the Victoria Speedster and Sedan Speedster went for US$6,000 ($115,637 in 2025 dollars). Speedster Eights have four instead of three speeds, and the customer could choose from several rear end ratios at no extra cost. 734 models have their parking lights mounted on the fenders, not on the body like Standard Eights. They also feature senior car's hoods with for ventilation door. Only 113 cars were built.

Available 734 Speedster Eight models include:

Body style #422 Boattail Roadster Body style #443 Sedan Body style #445 Phaeton Body style #447 Victoria Body style #452 Runabout

In 1931, Packard introduced the Individual Custom Eight, which were longer wheelbases of the Standard Eight. Period advertisements showed examples with body colored radiator grilles whereas the Standard models had chrome grilles.

The 1932 Standard Eight was offered in thirteen body styles. In 1933, base price of the Standard Eight was US$2150, and was offered in fourteen body styles. The 1933 De Luxe Eight started at US$3350.

The five-passenger sedan was Packard's best-selling model for years. This helped Packard become the best-selling luxury brand between 1924 and 1930, as well as selling almost twice as many abroad as any other marque priced over US$2000.

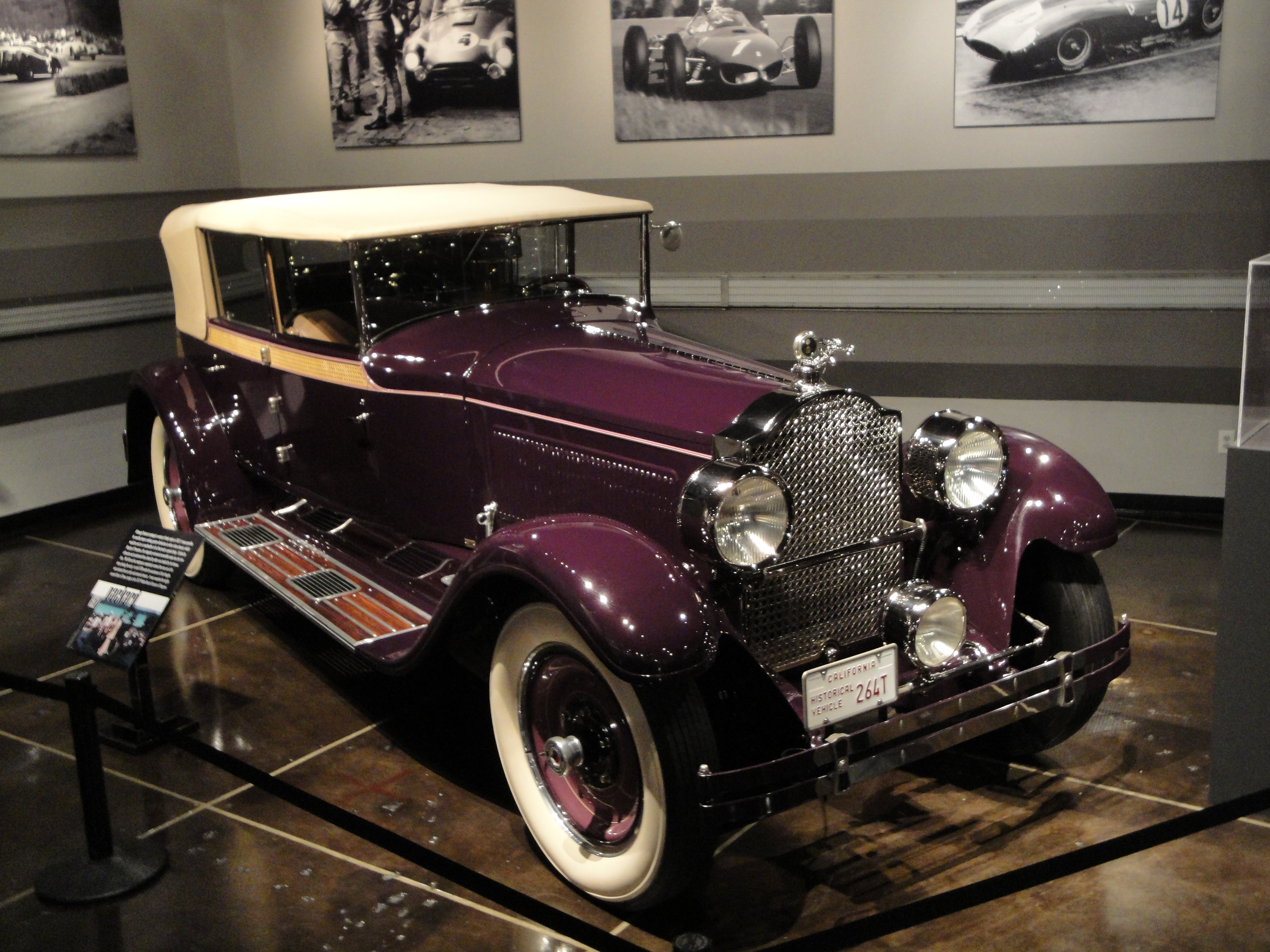
1927 Packard Third Series Eight Model 343 Convertible Sedan by Murphy

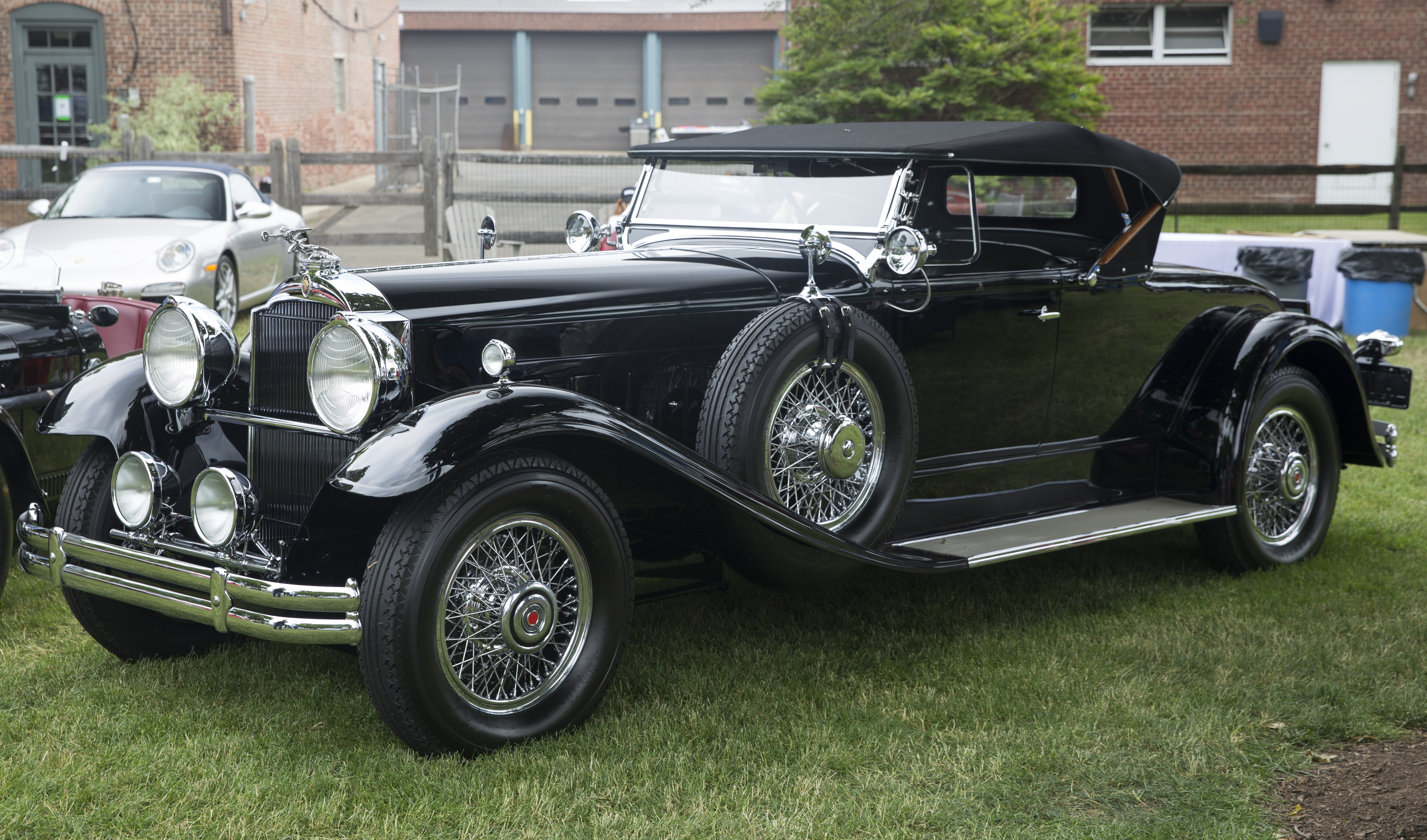
1930 Packard Seventh Series Deluxe Eight Roadster, Model 745

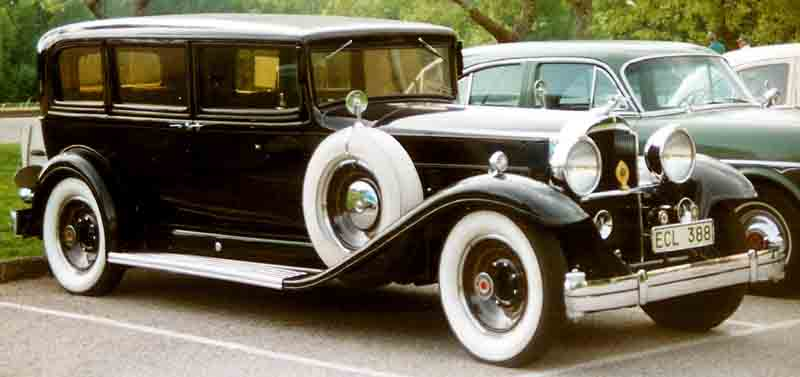
1932 Packard Ninth Series De Luxe Eight Model 904 sedan limousine

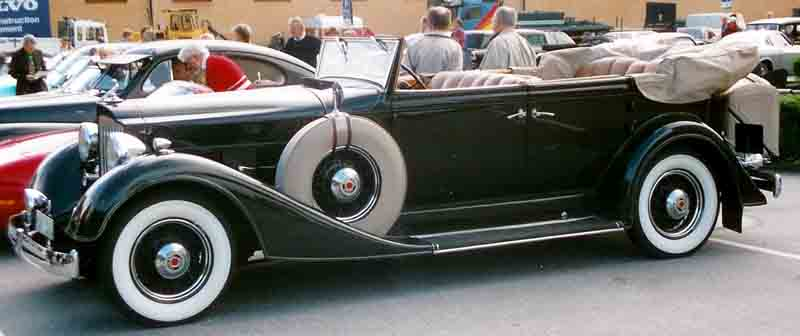
1934 Packard Eleventh Series Standard Eight Model 1101 convertible sedan

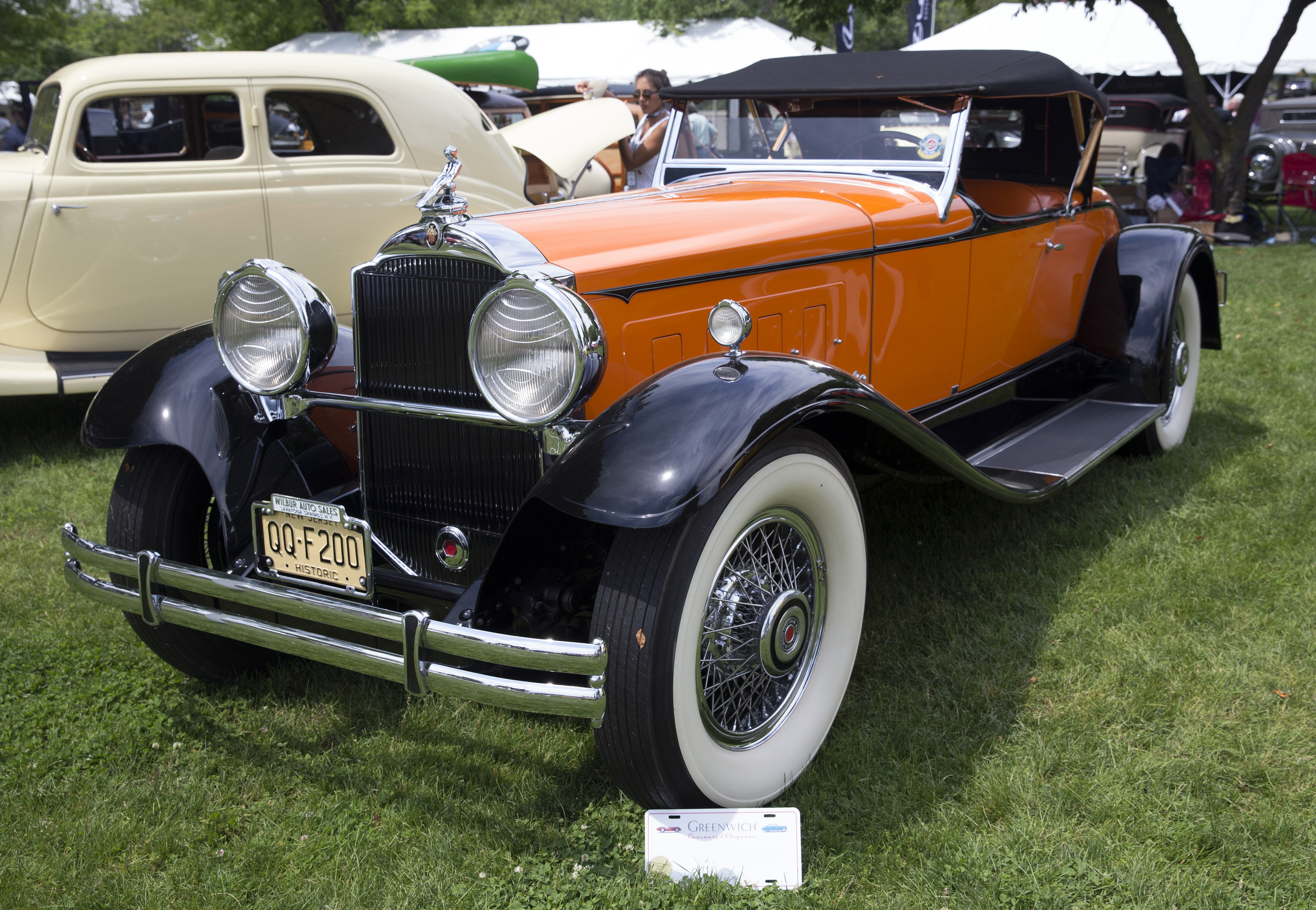
1930 Packard Seventh Series Roadster Speedster Model 734

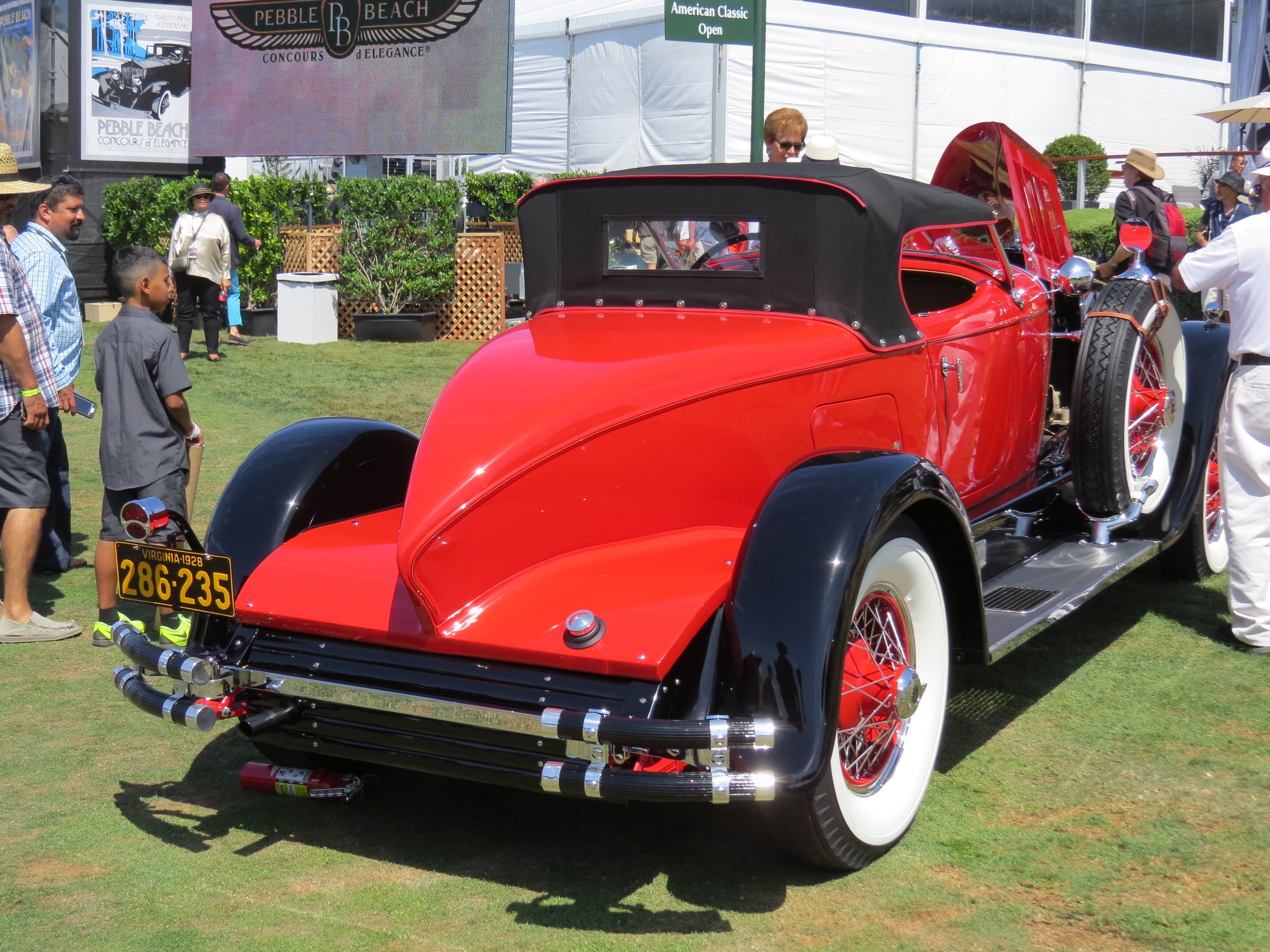
1930 Packard Seventh Series Boattail Speedster Model 734

== Packard Eight (1946-1950) ==
When Packard reintroduced the Packard Eight, they also introduced the Packard Station Sedan to offer a popular "woodie" appearance starting in 1948 with the modified body style, then adopting a commonly called ponton appearance.

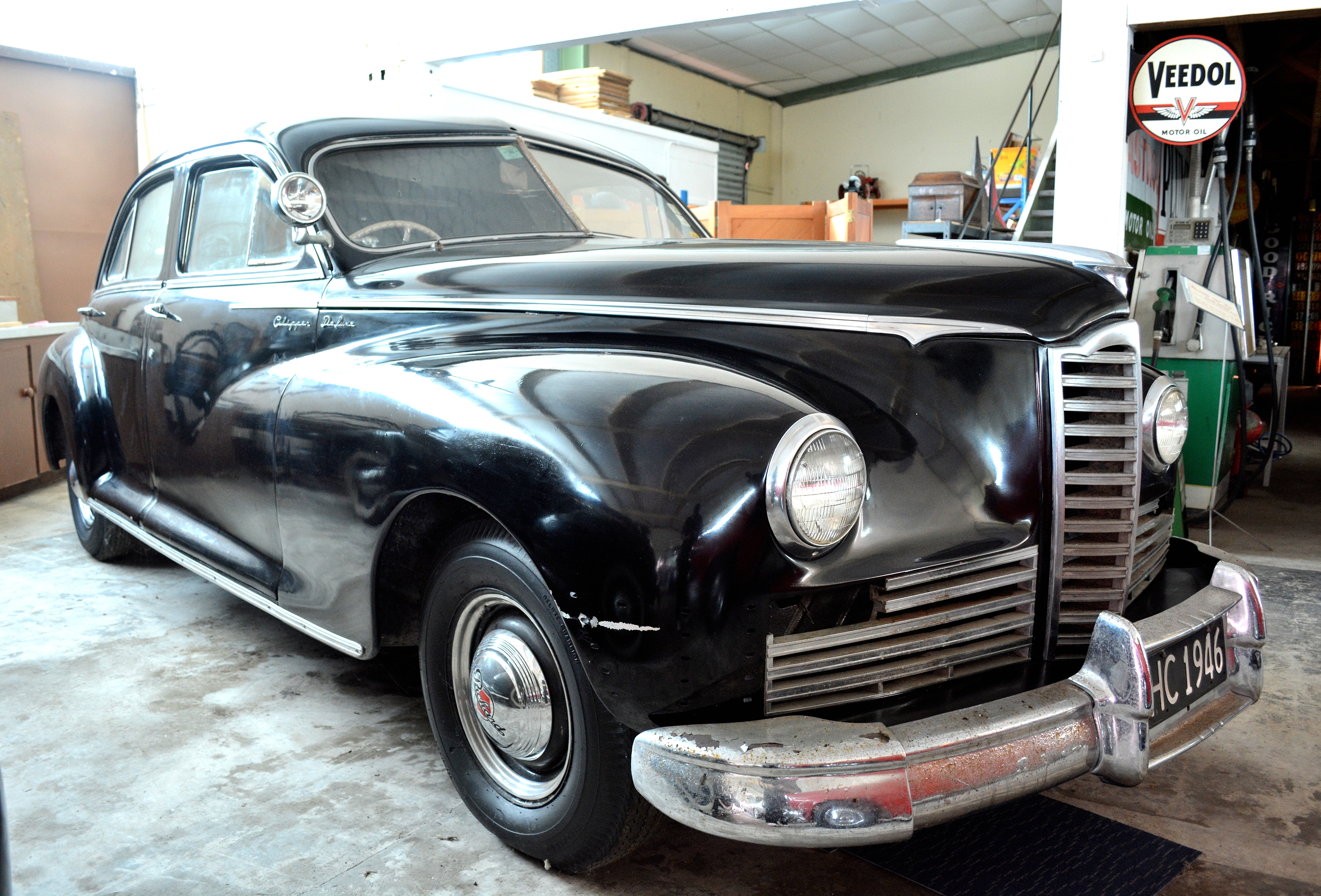
1946 Packard Clipper Eight

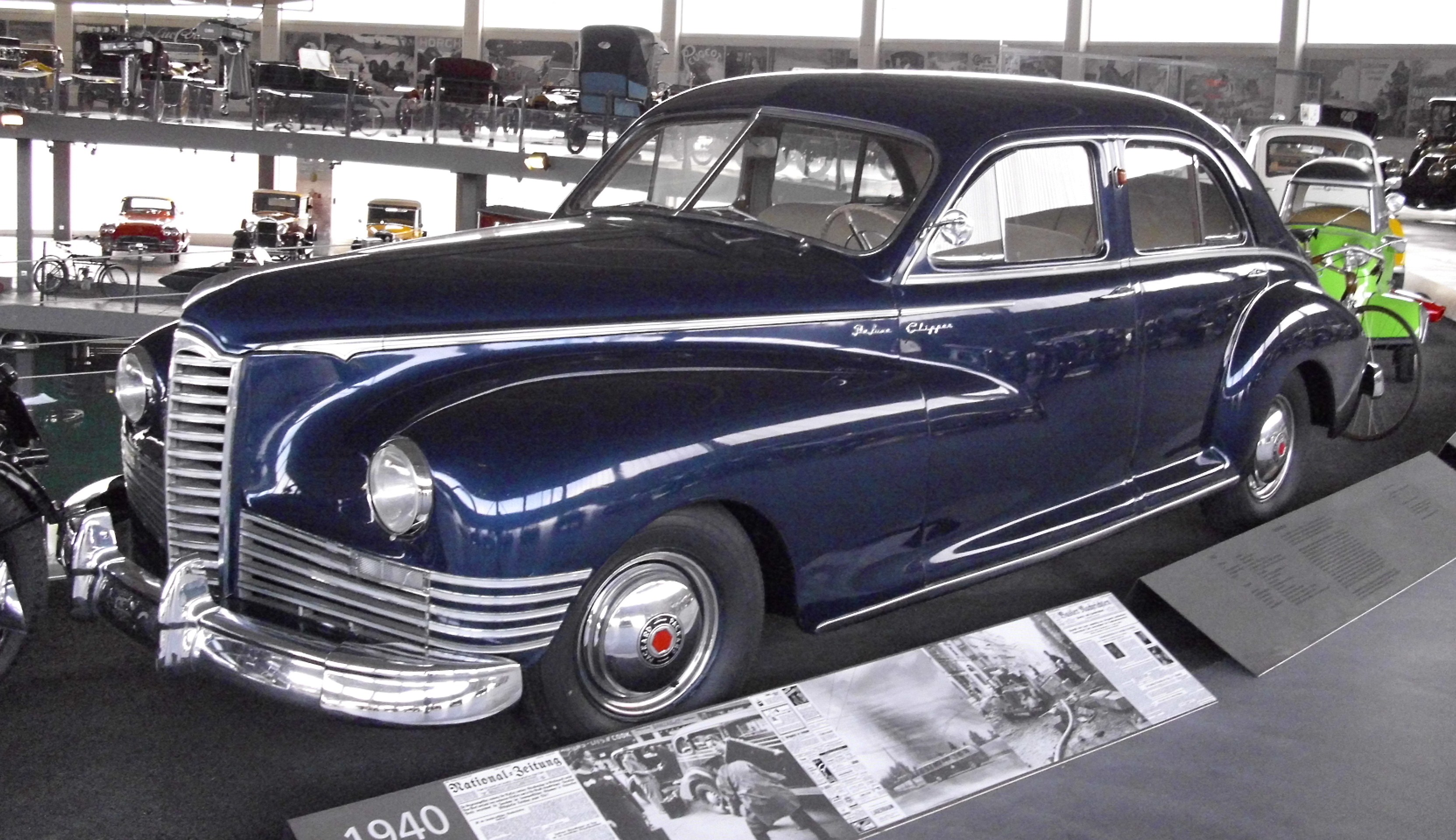
1947 Packard DeLuxe Clipper Eight

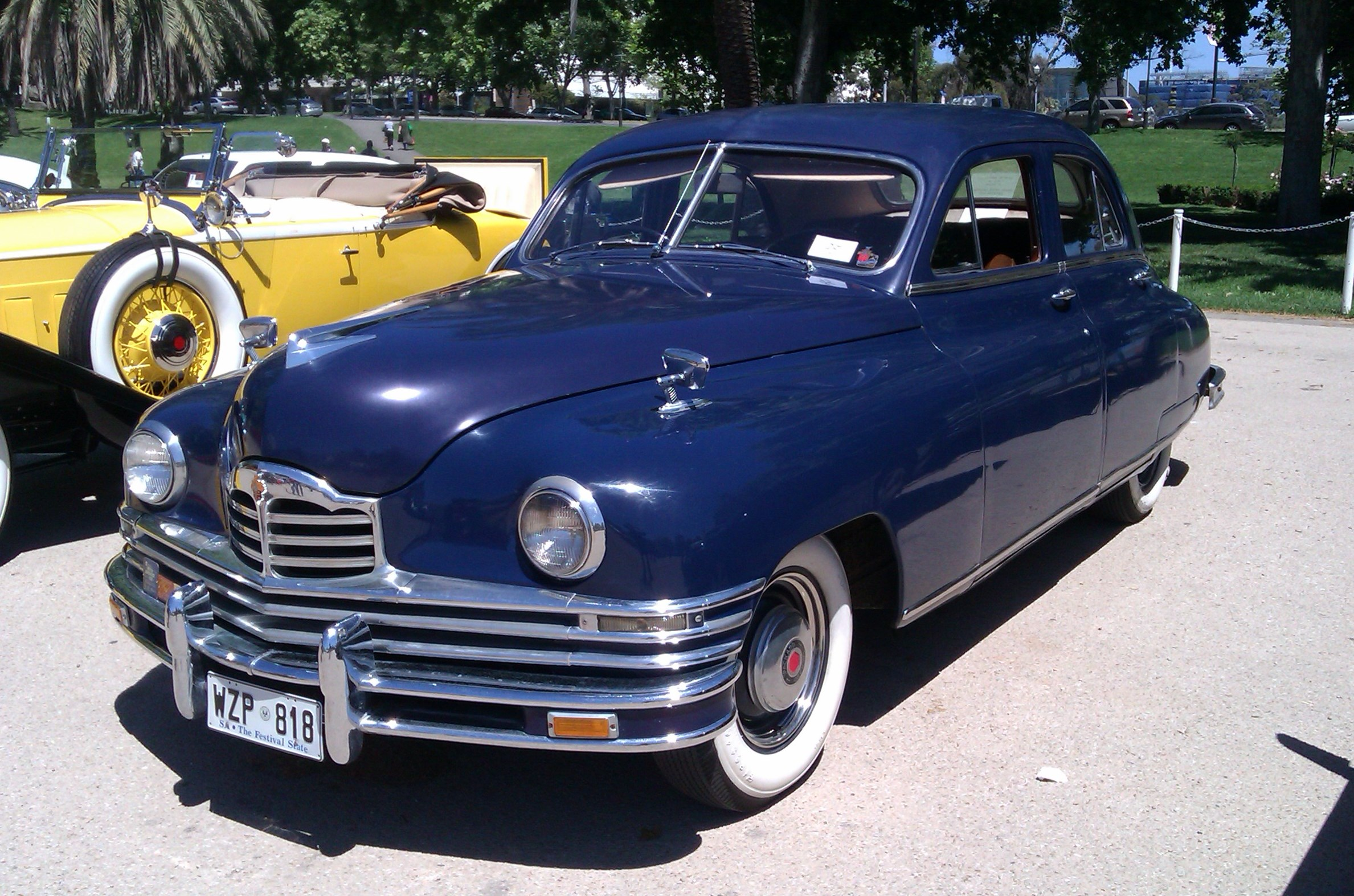
1948 Packard Eight

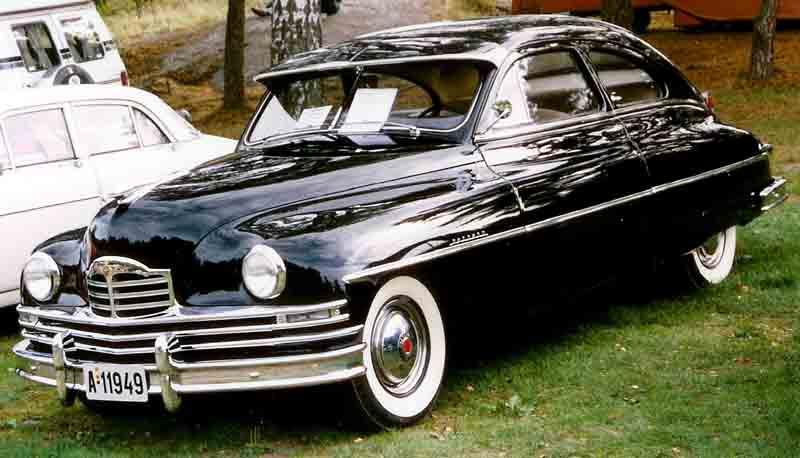
1949 Packard Eight

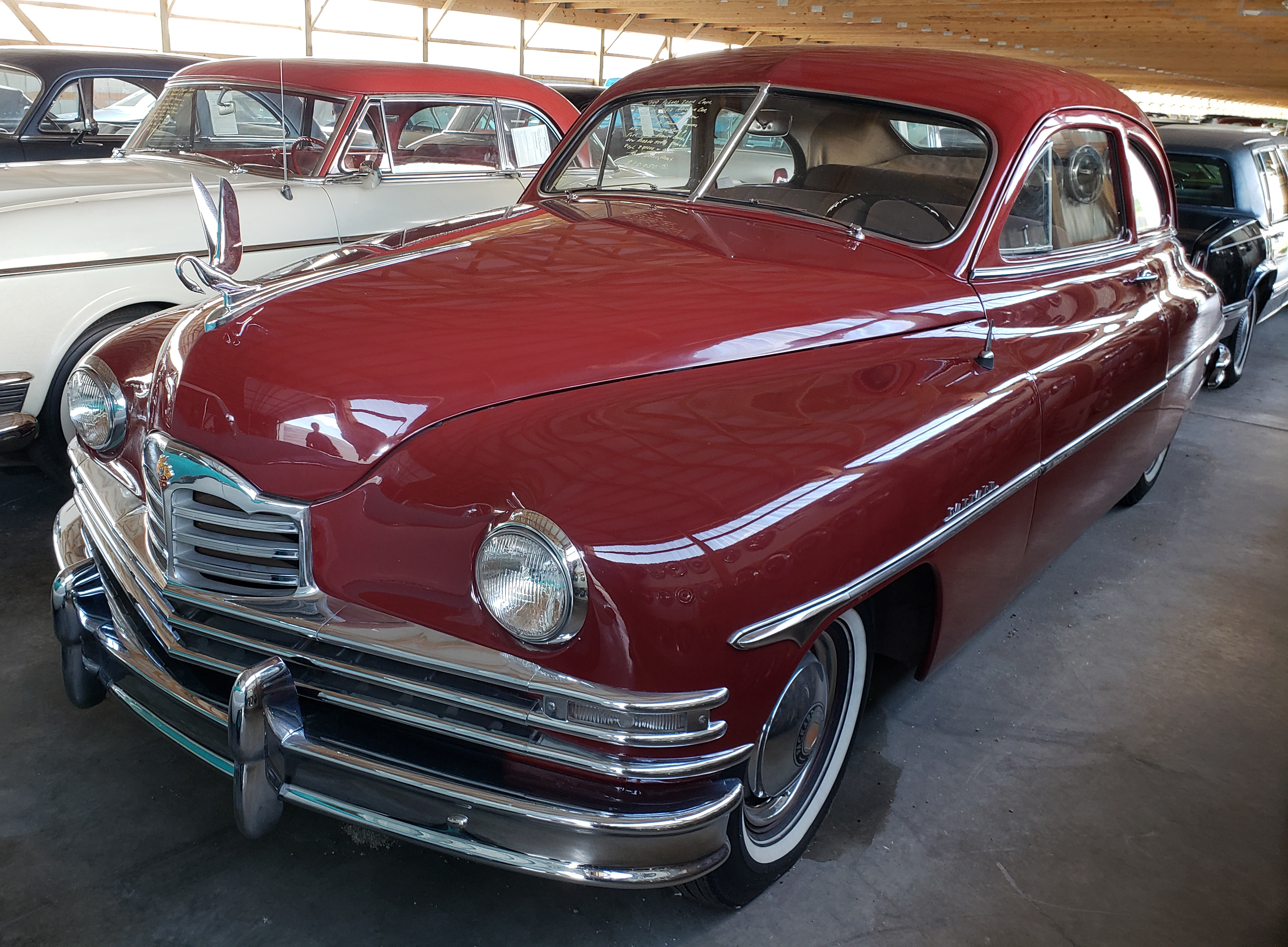
1950 Packard Eight

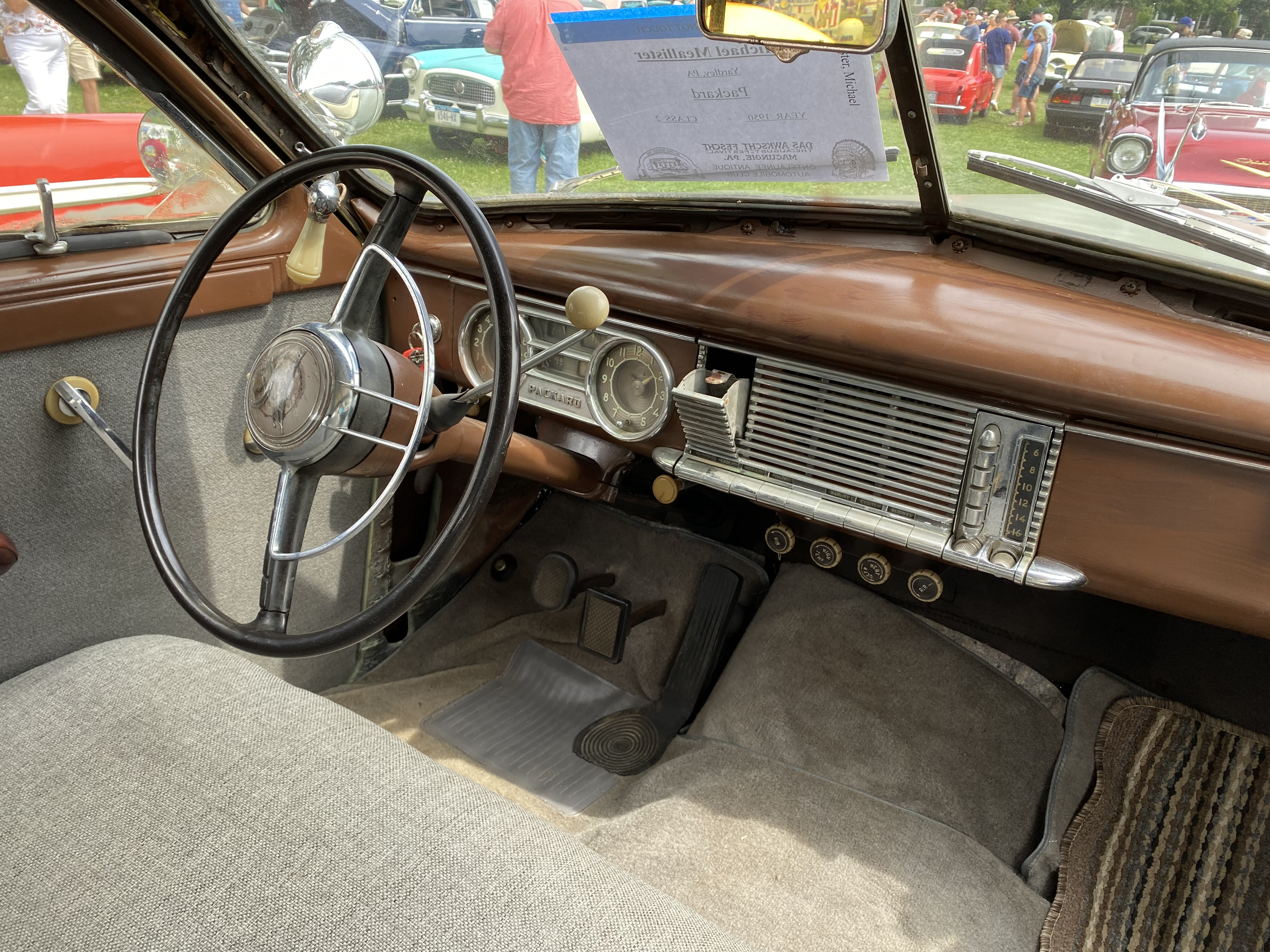
1950 Packard Eight Club Sedan interior
