= Packard One-Twenty =

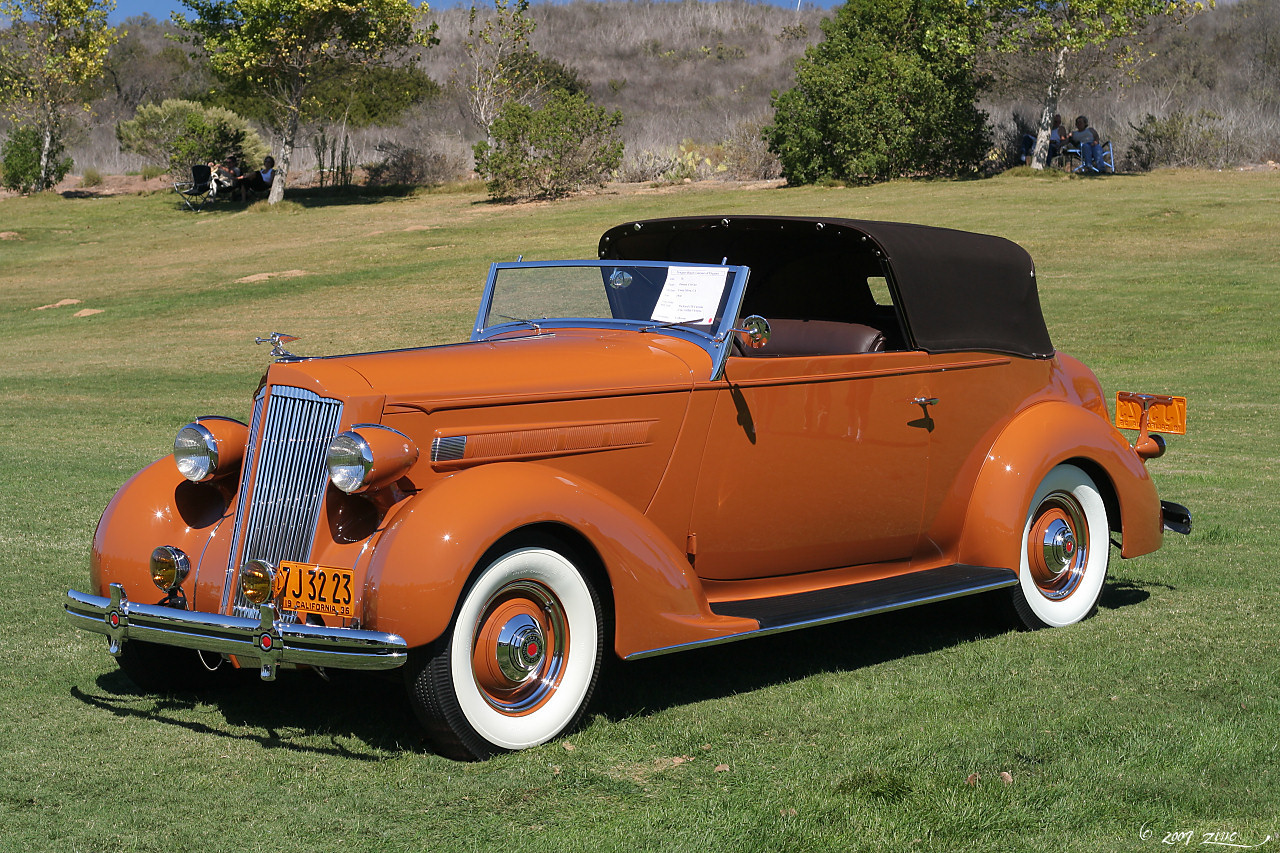
- 1936 Packard 120 Convertible Victoria by LeBaron

Overview
- Manufacturer: Packard
- Model years: 1935–1937; 1939–1941
- Assembly: Packard Automotive Plant, Detroit, Michigan, United States

Body and chassis
- Class: Full-size luxury car
- Layout: Front-engine, rear-wheel-drive

Chronology
- Predecessor: Packard Light Eight
- Successor: Packard 200

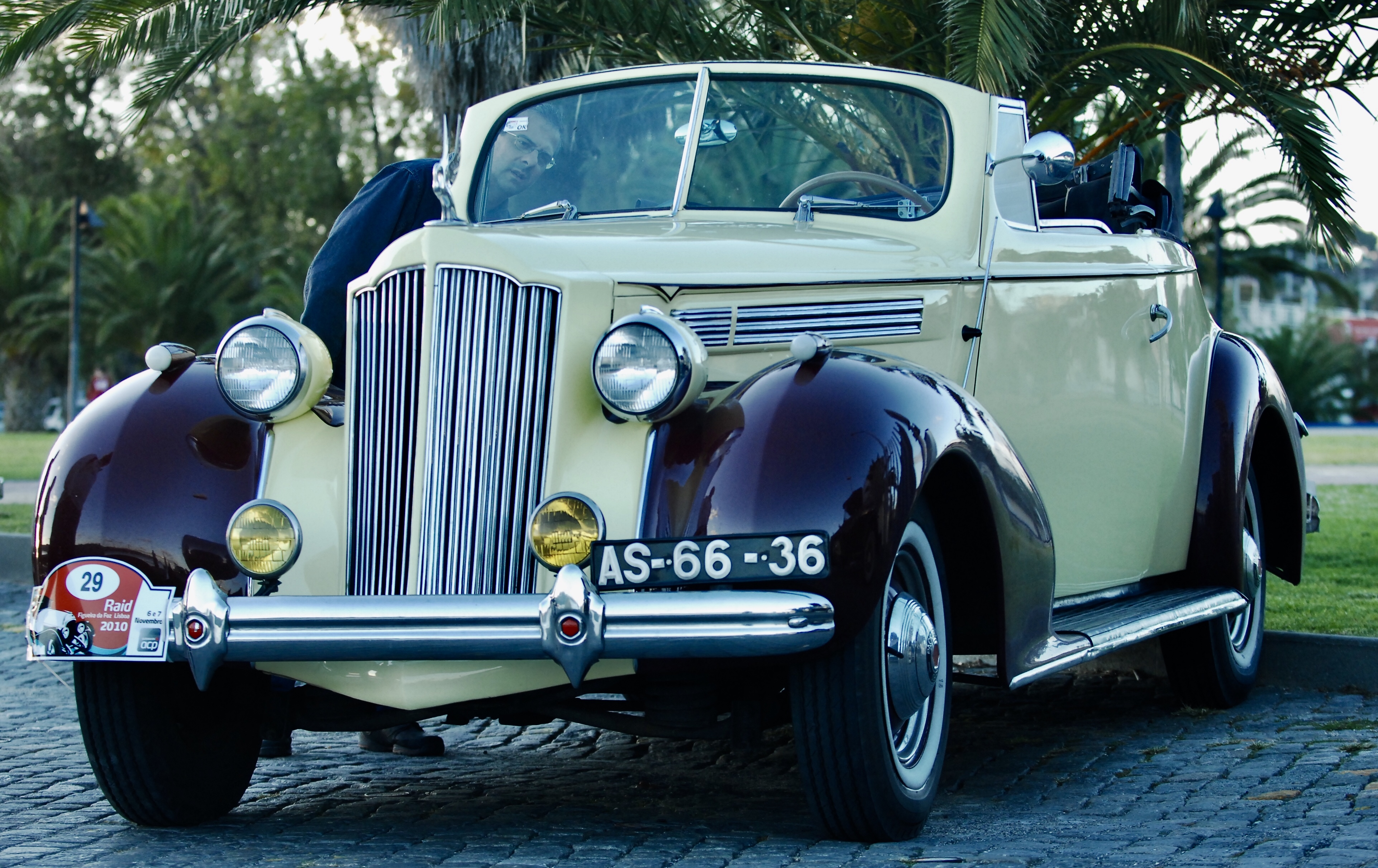
1939 Packard 120 Convertible Coupé

The Packard Twelfth Series One-Twenty is an automobile produced by the Packard Motor Car Company of Detroit, Michigan, from 1935 to 1937 and from 1939 through the 1941 model years. The One-Twenty model designation was derived from the wheelbase, and it was replaced by the Packard 200.

The One-Twenty signified the first time that Packard had entered into the highly competitive mid-priced eight-cylinder car market. Packard enthusiasts view the production of the One-Twenty and the Six/One-Ten models as the start of Packard's losing its hold on the market as the premier American luxury automotive brand. It was a marketing strategy shared with GM's LaSalle, the Chrysler Airstream, and the Lincoln-Zephyr. It was introduced after Rolls-Royce brought to market the Rolls-Royce Twenty, which was manufactured between 1922 and 1929 (succeeded by the Rolls-Royce 20/25 which was built until 1936).

The introduction of the One-Twenty (and later the Six/One-Ten models) was a necessary move to keep Packard in business during the final years of the Great Depression, expanding on an earlier approach with the Packard Light Eight. Branding the One-Twenty a Packard afforded buyers the cachet of owning a Packard. Other reasons the company decided to forgo the development of a companion brand name to sell the less expensive models may have been linked to its single production line capability at its Grand Boulevard manufacturing plant or to the expense of launching a new brand of automobile. It also ushered in a novel advertising approach, commissioning an advertising "jingle" called "When Heaven Was at the Corner of Sycamore and Main".

== The Safe-T-Flex suspension ==
This car introduced the independent front suspension to the Packard line. Its so-called "Safe-T-Flex" suspension was an unequal upper and lower A-arm type with the largest possible lower A-arm composed of two different arms bolted together at a ninety-degree angle.

The support arm was a heavy steel forging reaching a few degrees forward of lateral from the front wheel support to as close to the centerline of the car as is practicable. An integral pad socketed the helical spring, whose upper end reached a high frame cross-beam. A tubular, hence lighter, steel torque arm was bolted to the support arm somewhat inboard of the wheel to permit a sufficient steering arc. It reached the frame nearly at the dashboard with a spherical rubber bearing. The upper A-arm was conventionally welded and oriented parallel to the lower one. Between it and the frame was an old-fashioned horizontal shock absorber whose two cylinders were side by side.

The support arm carried all the load; the torque arm carried the accelerating and decelerating torque; the upper A-arm controlled the camber. Advantages claimed for the system included superior maintenance of wheel alignment from the wide spread of the lower A-arm, a permanent fixing of the caster angle, and an increased percentage of the braking force transmitted to the frame through the torque arm.

== First generation (1935–1937) ==
First generation
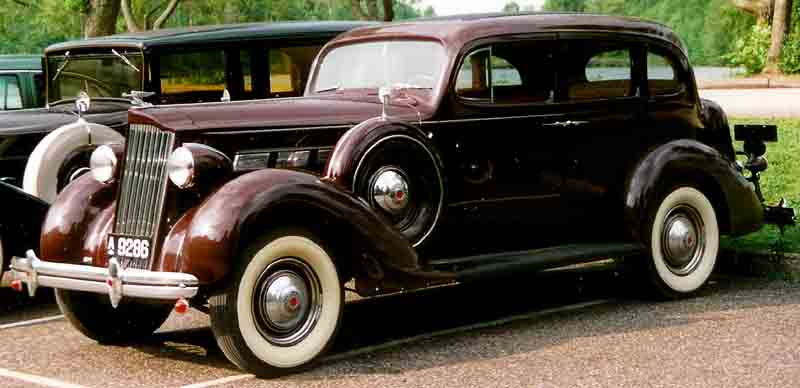
- 1937 Packard Fifteenth Series One-Twenty Touring Sedan

Overview
- Model years: 1935–1937

Body and chassis
- Body style: 2-door coupé; 2-door convertible; 2-door sedan (1935 only); 4-door sedan; 4-door Station wagon (1937 only)
- Layout: Front-engine, rear-wheel-drive
- Related: Packard Eight

Powertrain
- Engine: 257 cu in (4.2 L) I8 (1935); 282 cu in (4.6 L) I8 (1936–37)
- Transmission: 3-speed manual

Dimensions
- Wheelbase: 120 in (3,048.0 mm)
- Curb weight: 3,688 lb (1,673 kg)

In its introduction year, the Packard One-Twenty was available in a broad array of body styles including two and four-door sedans, convertible and Club Coupe. The One-Twenty, weighing in at 3,688 lb (1,673 kg), was powered by an all-new Packard aluminum-head L-head inline eight producing 110 bhp (82 kW) at 3850 rpm. Prices ranged from $980 ($22,476 in 2024 dollars) for the three-passenger business coupe to $1,095 ($25,113 in 2024 dollars) for the Touring Sedan. Introduced in January 1935, the car was an immediate success with consumers, with Packard producing 24,995 One-Twentys, compared to 7,000 of all other type Packards for the year, while competing with the 1935 LaSalle Series 50.

For 1936 Packard increased the displacement on the L-head eight, increasing its output to 120 bhp (89 kW), making the car capable of reaching a top speed of 85 mph (137 km/h). The One-Twenty added a convertible four-door-sedan model which was the most expensive model in the range priced at $1,395 ($31,994 in 2024 dollars). A total 55,042 units rolled off the line in 1936, the highest production that the One-Twenty would reach. A built in radio was available at a cost of $59.50 ($1,353 in 2024 dollars).

In 1937, the One-Twenty went up-market as the company introduced the Packard Six, the first six-cylinder Packard in ten years. For 1937, the One-Twenty broadened its model range and was now available in "C" and "CD" trim levels. The line also added a wood-bodied station wagon, Touring Sedan and limousine built on a 138 in (3,500 mm) wheelbase and priced under $2,000. Introduced in September 1936, 50,100 units were produced during series production.

For 1938, the One-Twenty name was dropped and its model folded into the Packard Eight model range, bringing the model name into parity with the Packard Six.

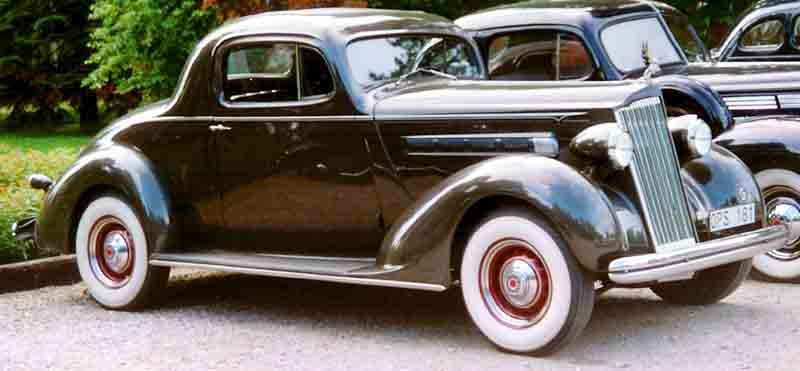
1936 Packard Fourteenth Series Eight 120-B 998 Business Coupé

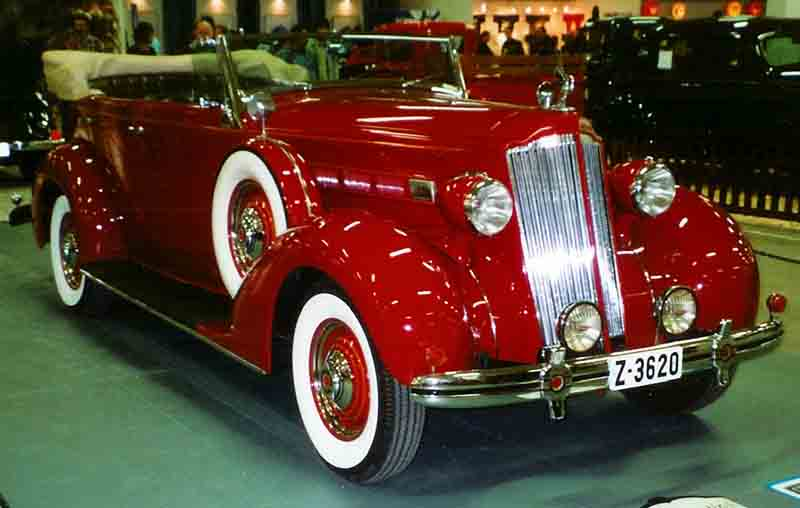
1936 Packard Fourteenth Series Eight 120-B 997 Convertible Sedan

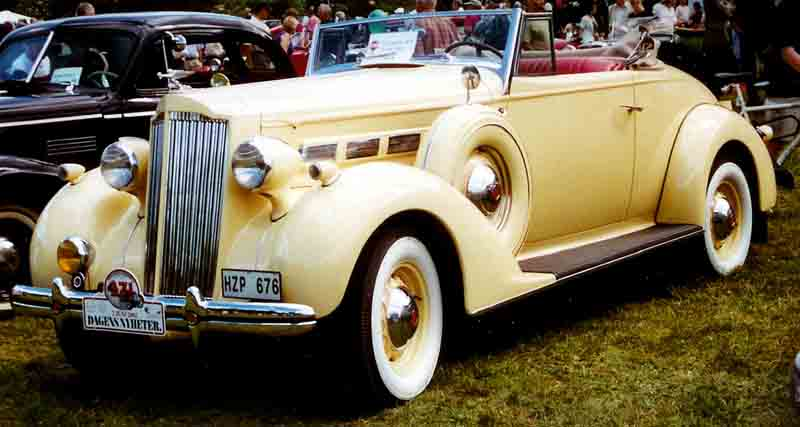
1937 Packard Fifteenth Series Eight 120-C 1099 Convertible Coupé

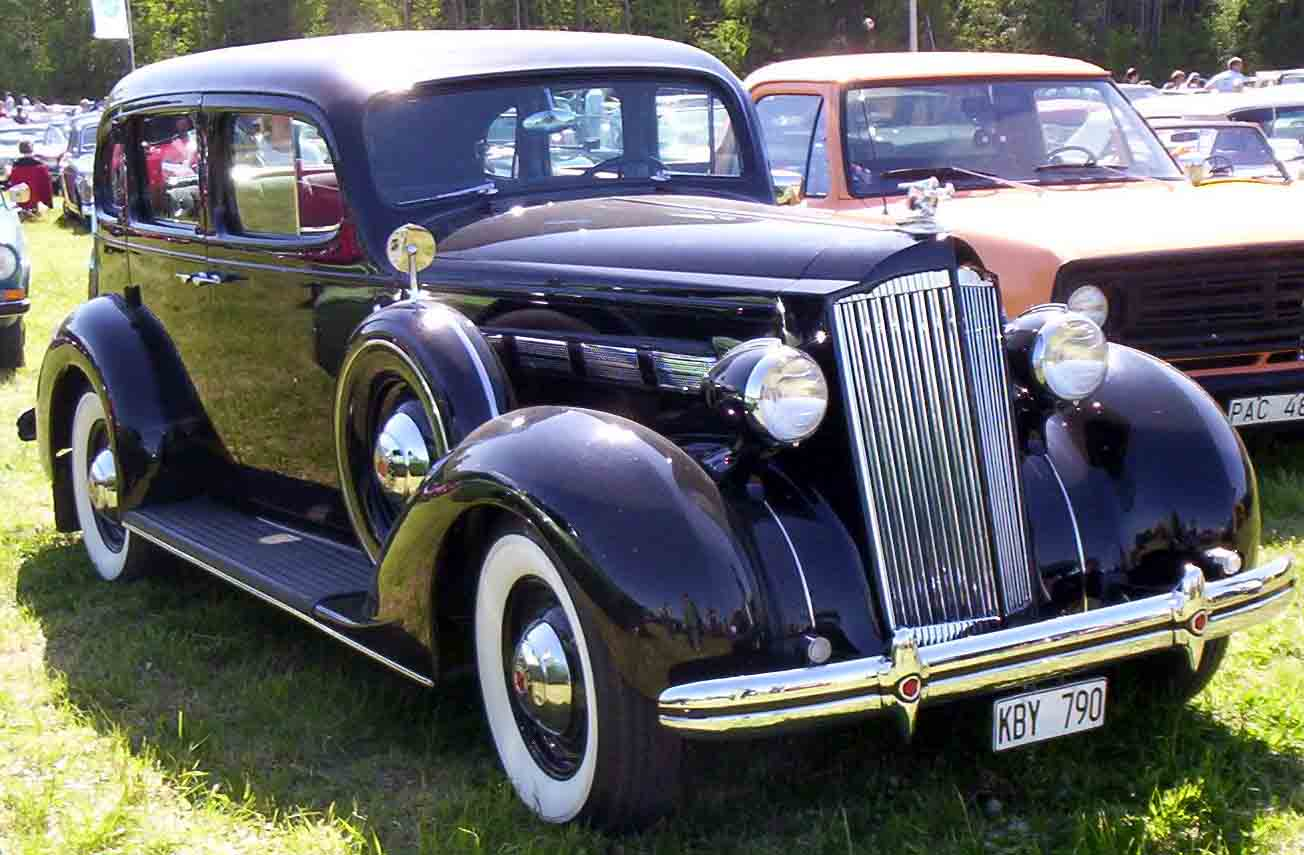
1937 Packard Fifteenth Series Eight 120-C 4-Door Sedan

== Second generation (1939–1942) ==
Second generation
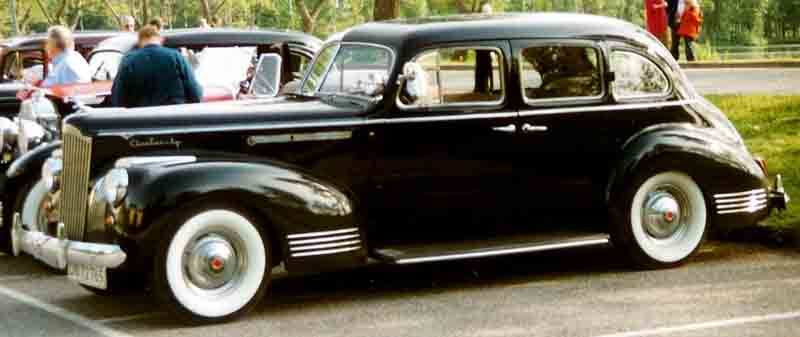
- 1941 Packard One-Twenty Touring Sedan

Overview
- Model years: 1939–1941

Body and chassis
- Body style: 2-door coupé; 2-door convertible; 2-/4-door sedan; 4-door convertible; 4-door station wagon (1941 only)
- Layout: Front-engine, rear-wheel-drive

Powertrain
- Engine: 282 cu in (4.6 L) I8
- Transmission: 3-speed manual

Dimensions
- Wheelbase: Models: Series 1701, 1801, 1901 (1939–41): 127 in (3,225.8 mm); Series 1702 (1939): 148 in (3,759.2 mm); Series 1801A Chassis (1940): 160 in (4,064.0 mm)
- Length: Models: Series 1701 and 1801 (1939–40): 200.75 in (5,099.0 mm); Series 1702 (1939): 221.5 in (5,626.1 mm); Series 1801A Chassis (1940): 233.75 in (5,937.2 mm); Series 1901 (1941): 206.25 in (5,238.8 mm); Series 1901 Station Wagon (1941): 216 in (5,486.4 mm)

Returning to the Packard model range, the One-Twenty continued to be offered in a full range of body styles from coupe to Touring Limousine, with prices for the model range between US$1,099 ($24,843 in 2024 dollars) and US$1,856 ($41,955 in 2024 dollars). New for the year was introduction of column shifting (known in Packard parlance as Handishift), which did away with the floor shifter. Introduced in September 1938, a total of 17,647 units were built.

In 1939, the company introduced a fifth, transverse shock absorber on the 120. It also offered Packard's Unimesh three-speed synchromesh transmission, the same as in the Twelve (and already standard on the Eight), as well as the new fourth-gear Econo-Drive overdrive, claimed to reduce engine speed 27.8%, and able to be engaged at any speed over 30 mph (48 km/h).

The series name One-Twenty officially became hyphenated for model year 1940. Again, the One-Twenty came in a full array of body styles, including a semi-custom Convertible Victoria by Howard "Dutch" Darrin. Introduced in August 1939, total model year output was 28,138 units.

In its final year as a model, the One-Twenty lost a number of body styles to the expanded One-Ten line of cars. The One-Twenty was available in business coupé, club coupe, two-door sedan, four-door sedan, convertible coupe, convertible sedan, and two station wagon styles. Production sank to 17,100 units.

For 1942, the One-Ten and One-Twenty were dropped as model names and their models folded into the Packard Six and Packard Eight lines. In its seven years in the Packard line-up, the One-Twenty saw a total production of 175,027 units.

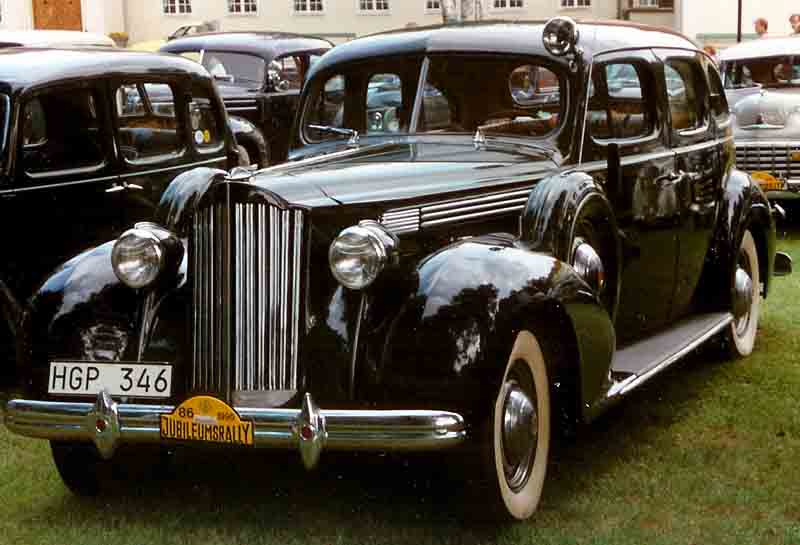
1939 Packard One-Twenty Touring Sedan (17th series)

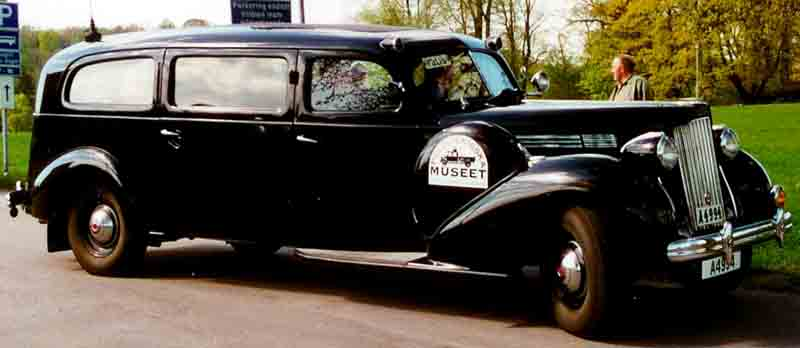
1939 Packard One-Twenty Police (17th series)

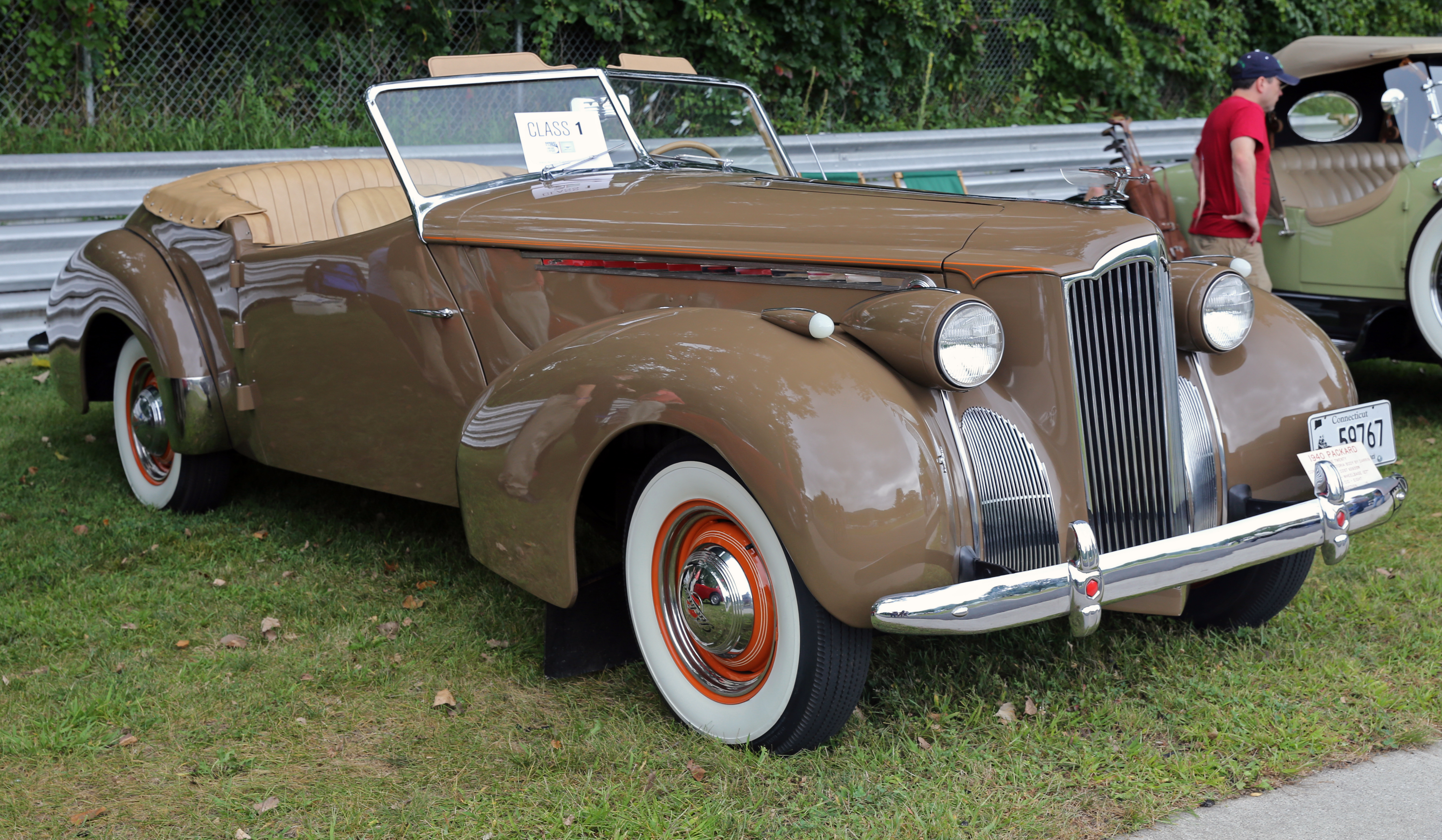
1940 Packard One-Twenty Darrin Convertible Victoria (18th series)

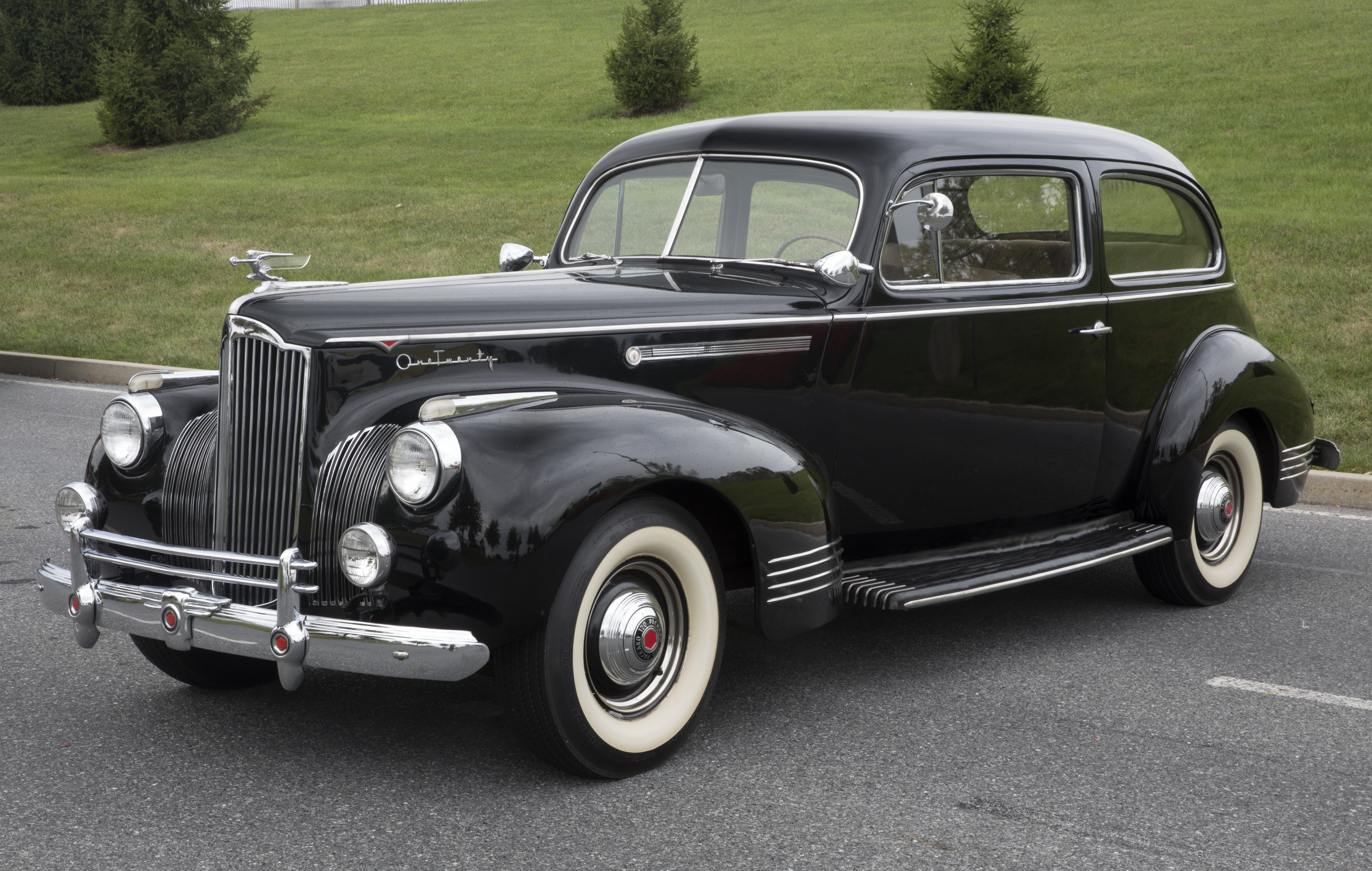
1941 Packard One-Twenty 2-door Touring Sedan (19th series)

== Notable vehicles ==
On August 29, 1935, a Packard One-Twenty convertible driven by the Belgian king Leopold III crashed in Küssnacht, Switzerland, killing his wife Astrid of Sweden, Queen of the Belgians.
