= Packard Station Sedan =

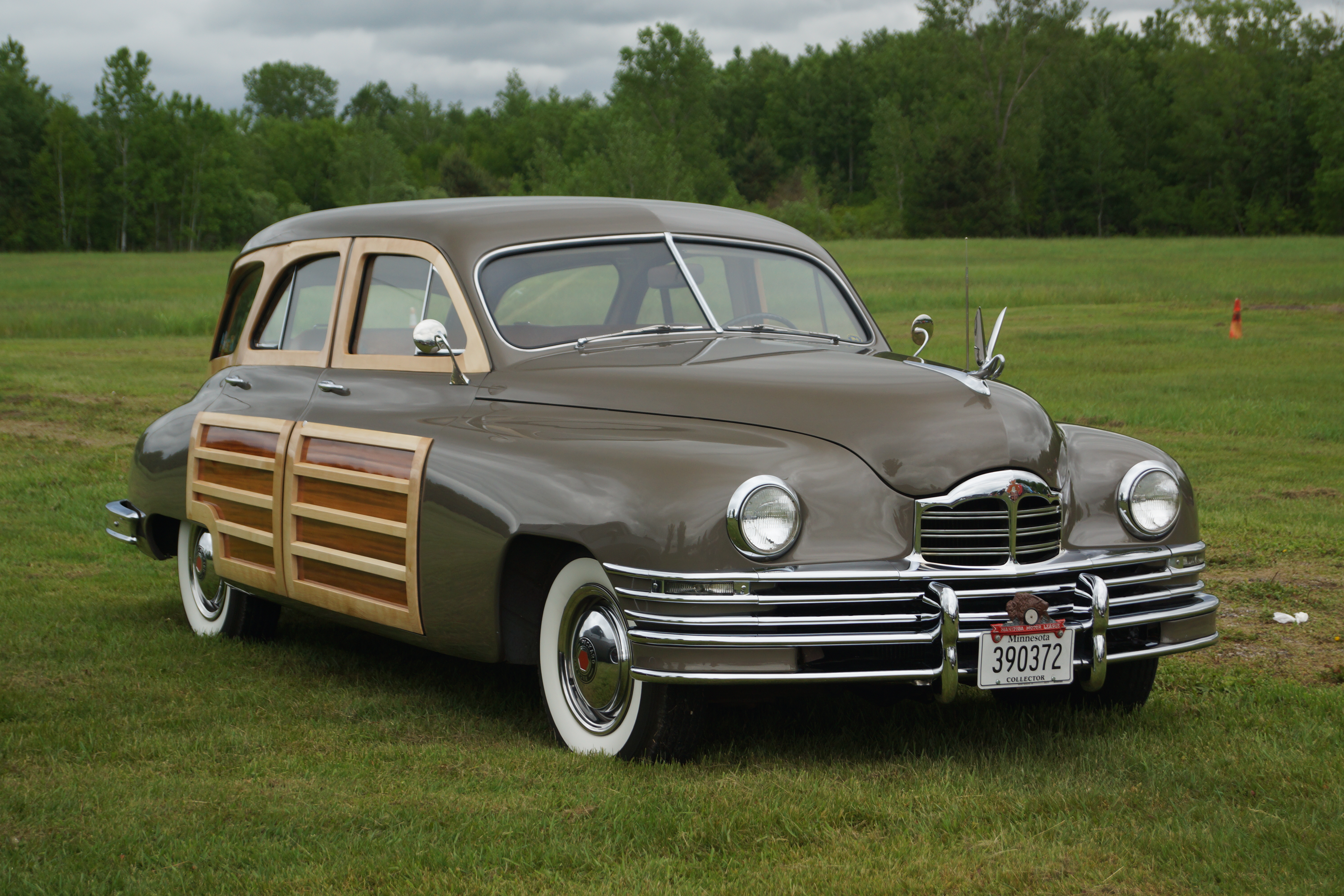
- 1948 Packard Station Sedan

Overview
- Manufacturer: Packard
- Production: 1948–1950
- Assembly: Packard Automotive Plant, Detroit, Michigan, United States

Body and chassis
- Body style: 4-door luxury station wagon
- Layout: Front-engine, rear-wheel-drive
- Related: Packard Eight (1946-1950)

Powertrain
- Engine: 288 cu in (4.7 L) I8
- Transmission: 3-speed manual Ultramatic (1950)

Dimensions
- Wheelbase: 120 in (3,048 mm)
- Length: 204.7 in (5,199 mm)
- Width: 77.5 in (1,968 mm)
- Height: 64.1 in (1,628 mm)
- Curb weight: 4,075 lb (1,848 kg)

Chronology
- Predecessor: Packard Super Eight One-Sixty Station Wagon

The Packard Station Sedan was a luxury station wagon model produced by the Packard Motor Car Company of Detroit, Michigan between 1948 and 1950, using the reintroduced Packard Eight platform. By offering the Station Sedan Packard could market a vehicle with station wagon attributes, but without the investment cost associated with a complete station wagon development program.

The Station Sedan used a combination of steel framing and body parts along with structural wood panels made from northern birch to create a "woody" station wagon-like car due to the growing popularity of them after World War II. Unlike other woody wagons of the day, which used wooden passenger compartments mounted to chassis of a particular car, the Station Sedan used a steel subframe and steel passenger doors onto which hard wood panels were mounted. The only wooden door on the vehicle was the rear gate assembly. Unlike competitor station wagons from Buick, Chrysler and Mercury, the Packard's length was not long enough to accommodate optional third row seating.

Neither a sedan, nor true station wagon, the Station Sedan enjoyed limited success, with a listed retail price of US$3,459 ($45,206 in 2024 dollars) for its final year of 1950, and was discontinued when the 1951 Packard models were introduced.

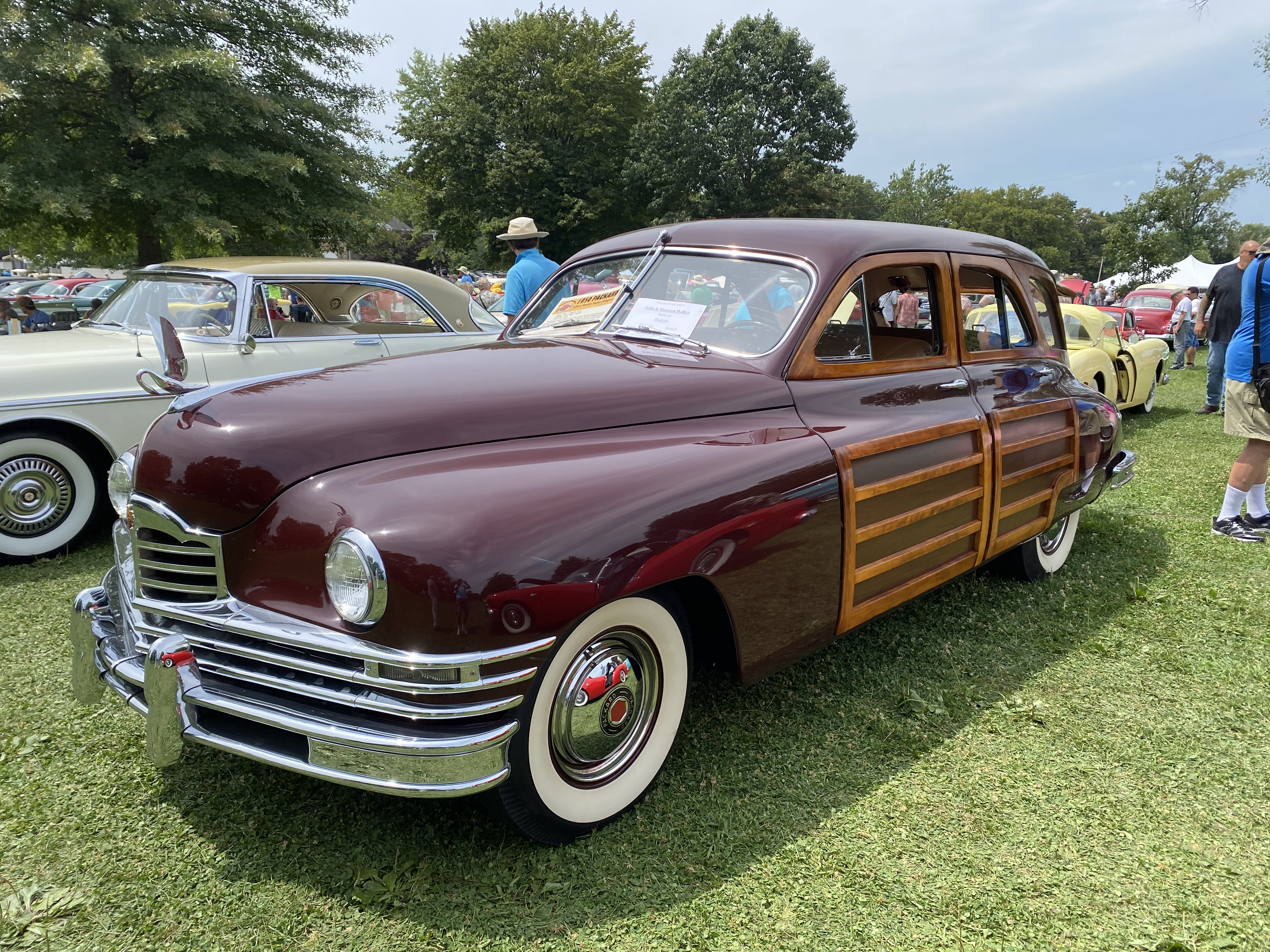
1949 Packard Station Sedan

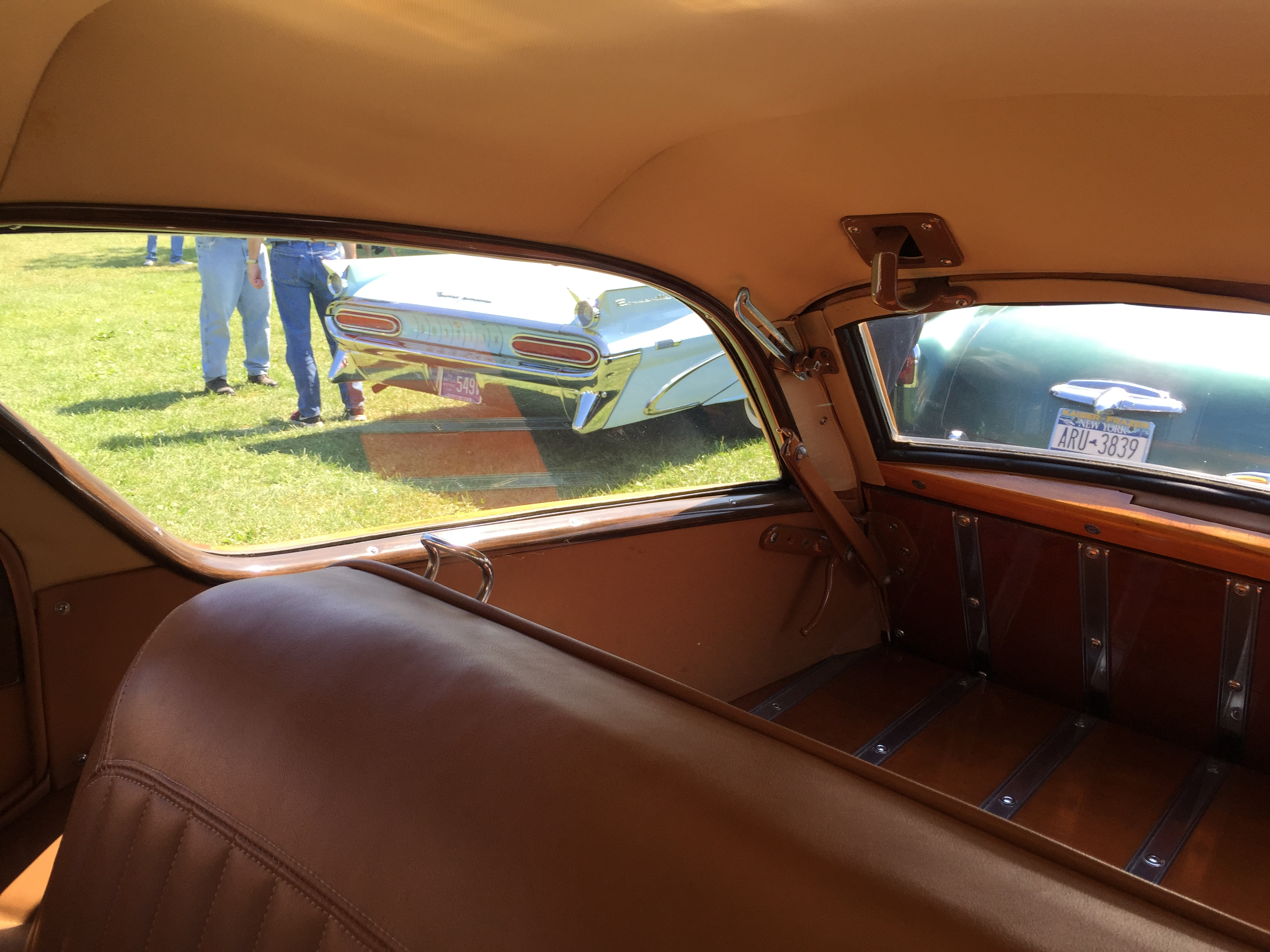
1949 Packard Station Sedan cargo area

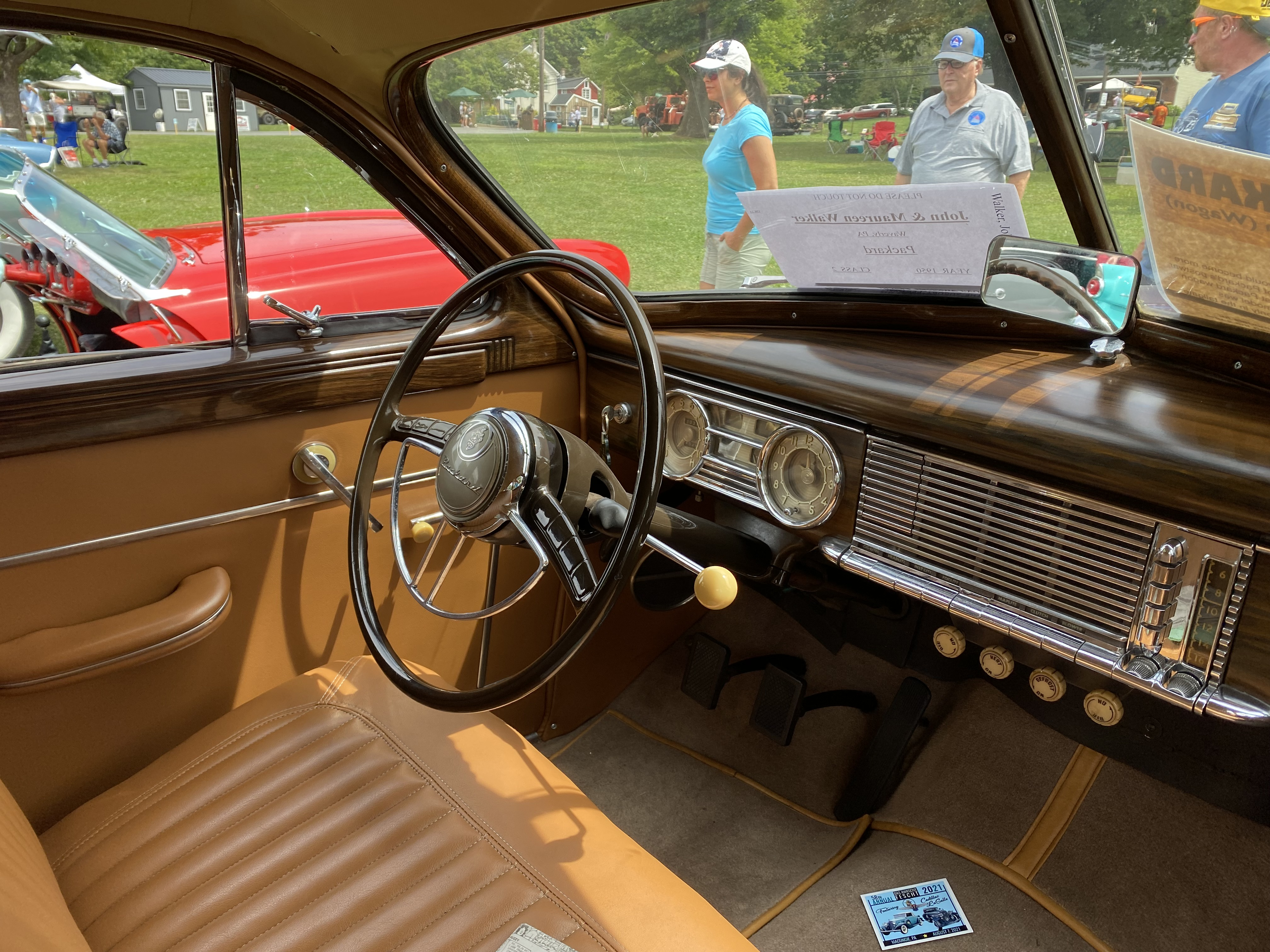
1950 Packard Station Sedan interior

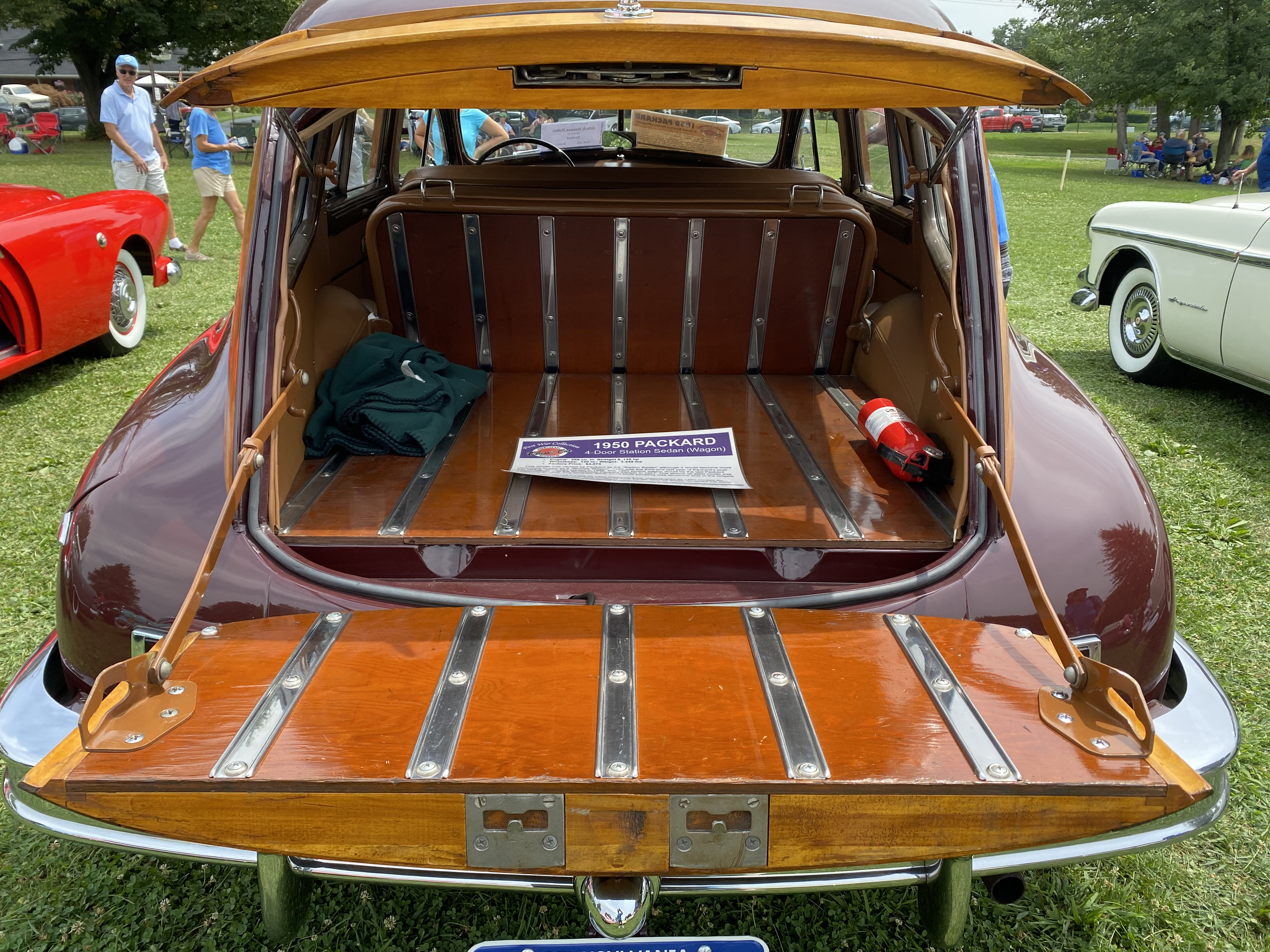
1950 Packard Station Sedan with tailgate open

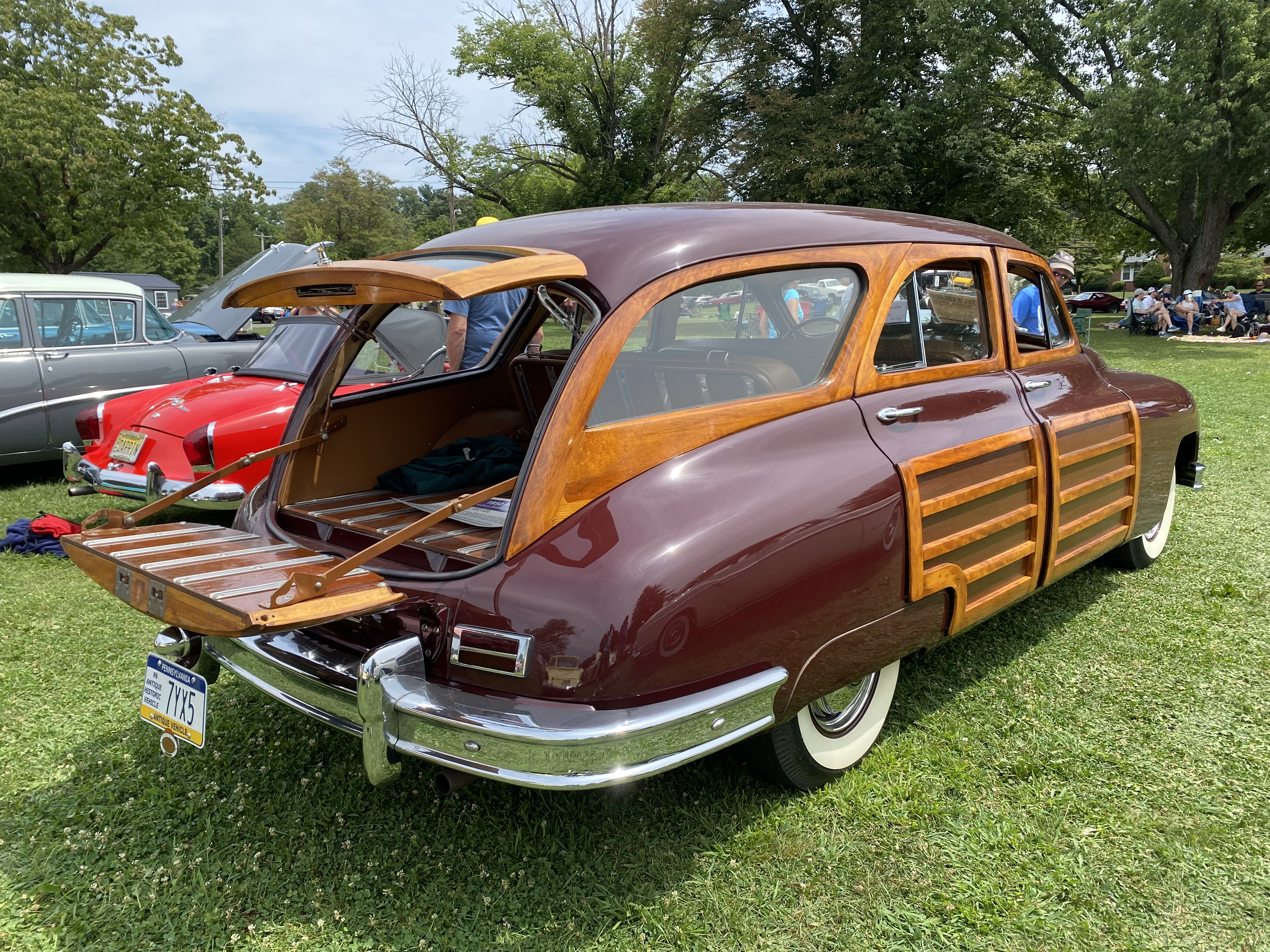
1950 Packard Station Sedan rear profile
