= When Heaven Was at the Corner of Sycamore and Main =

When Heaven was at the Corner of Sycamore and Main was an advertising slogan used by the Packard Motor Car Company to help promote their luxury automobile starting at the end of the 1930s.

== Overview ==
By the late 1930s, the Packard Motor Car Company had established itself as a major player among American manufacturers of luxury cars. Packard's image was also one of its biggest marketing challenges. In the minds of most Americans, Packard symbolized power, wealth, and glamour, items that were in short supply during the Great Depression. The challenge for Packard was to maintain its reputation for building finely crafted automobiles while beginning to market at least some of its cars in a price range that would be affordable to middle-class Americans in the midst of the economic issues of the decade. It was from this that the advertising agency, Young and Rubicam created "When Heaven was at the Corner of Sycamore and Main," an advertisement designed to help Packard sell its low-end automobiles, the Packard One-Ten, and the Packard One-Twenty.

== Historical context ==
The first Packards were built by James Ward Packard and William Doud Packard and tested in the streets of their hometown, Warren, Ohio in 1899. The single cylinder, nine horsepower engine performed ably, for which soon after they named the machine the Model A.

The Packards were typical of the many tinkers, visionaries, and hard-headed businessmen who coalesced around the idea of the gasoline-powered automobile, a product of the social and economic changes occurring in the United States and Europe at the turn of the 20th century. By the 1920s, more than 180 American automobile companies had sprung into business in towns and cities across the Eastern and Mid-Western United States. Other companies were also started across Europe in England, Germany, and Italy especially. Cars were a popular commodity, and the public clamored for them. It was in this market that car companies grew very rapidly. Packard was soon marketed as a luxury car, and captured a large section of the elite section of the American market. By 1923, the Packard Motor Car Company was earning $7 million in profits a year.

== Target market ==
Packard's traditional market had been the elite of American society, those with enough cash on hand to spend $5000 on a car in a time when the average annual income was $1400. Packard preferred to target these wealthy consumers, but it would be forced to change its marketing strategy after the Wall Street crash of 1929.

The crash and subsequent economic collapse plunged the country into a crisis. By the middle of the 1930s, annual earnings for Americans had dropped dramatically and about a quarter of the workforce was unemployed. In response, Packard introduced a line of affordable cars that many more Americans would be able to buy.

== Marketing strategy ==
"When Heaven Was at the Corner of Sycamore and Main" ran in 1938 as part of the Packard campaign "Maybe You Were that Boy." The ad campaign was crafted by Packard and its advertising agency, Young and Rubicam, as part of a two tiered approach, one for the high end wealthy market, and the other for Americans with less money and desire for luxury products. "When Heaven was at the Corner of Sycamore and Main" did not specifically mention the cheaper Packard models, but was still targeted towards the lower end of the car market. It was meant to show that the car was something that Americans could actually afford. The ad simultaneously tried to cash in on the nostalgia of the old Packard model and the newer economic realities.

== Outcome ==
In the short term, Packard's low-end advertising and marketing strategy was a success. Middle-class car buyers were aware that they could buy Packards for less than other luxury car brands, such as Cadillac, Lincoln, or Chrysler. The ratio of sales between Packard's economy and luxury cars shot up from 3 to 1 in the mid-1930s to 12 to 1 in 1939.

In the longer run, however, this blurring of Packard's image was disastrous for the company. Even though the public perceived the Packard as a quality car, people no longer associated it with luxury and premier craftsmanship. Packard simply became another car brand, near but not at the top of the industry. In addition, until 1950, Packard refused to adapt to an automotive standard that had been introduced at General Motors in the 1920s- yearly restyling of models. Because Packards tended to look the same the year after year, the public began to see the brand as outdated and less desirable.
