= Packard Automotive Plant =

Former auto factory in Detroit, Michigan

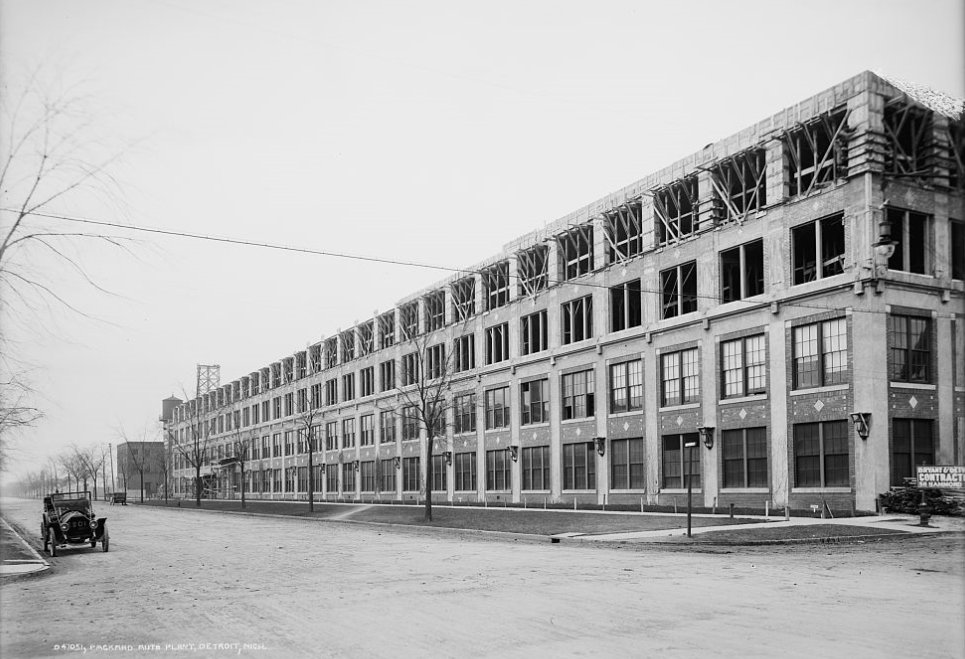
- The Packard Plant's administrative building during the addition of two floors circa 1911

General information
- Status: Closed with exception of the 1939 addition known as Building 22 which was successfully renovated in 2015. All other renovations efforts failed & were halted in October of 2020. Demolition began in October 2022, and second round began in January 2023. Demolition halted in April 2023, has since resumed and is ongoing. A last minute decision in 2024 was made to preserve the iconic administration buildings. As of January 2025 they are all that remains of the original 1911 structure.
- Type: Automobile factory
- Location: 5555 Concord Street; Detroit, Michigan, U.S.
- Coordinates: 42°22′46.62″N 83°1′44.14″W
- Construction started: 1903
- Completed: 1911 (with the last of its 6 expansions completed in 1939)
- Closed: 1958
- Demolished: Late 2024

Technical details
- Floor area: 3,500,000 sq ft (330,000 m^{2})

Design and construction
- Architect: Albert Kahn

The Packard Automotive Plant was an automobile-manufacturing factory in Detroit, Michigan, where luxury cars were made by the Packard Motor Car Company and later by the Studebaker-Packard Corporation. Demolition began on building 21 on October 27, 2022, and a second round of demolition began on building 28 on January 24, 2023, which was wrapped up by April 1, however all demolition efforts by the City of Detroit halted, which stopped finishing demolition work of building 21. The Packard Plant currently sits empty and partially demolished, with many parcels still remaining.

== Design and operation ==
=== Under Packard ===
The 3,500,000-square-foot (325,000 m^{2}) factory, designed by Albert Kahn Associates using Trussed Concrete Steel Company products is located on 40 acres (16 ha) of land on East Grand Boulevard on Detroit's east side. It included the first use of reinforced concrete in the United States for industrial construction in the automobile industry.

The Packard plant was opened in 1903 and contained 10,000 square feet of floor space and at the time was considered the most modern automobile manufacturing facility in the world: modern, efficient, and massive in scale. By 1908, when an enlargement for the construction of trucks was announced, the factory was already six times larger than when constructed and occupied over fourteen acres of space. At its peak the complex employed 40,000 people, including skilled craftsmen involved in over eighty trades. The plant turned out Packard automobiles from 1903 to 1956, except during World War II, when production was shifted to war material, particularly the Packard V-1650 Merlin, which powered the North American P-51 Mustang fighter plane.

=== After Packard ===
The factory complex closed in 1958, though other businesses operated on the premises or used it for storage until the late 1990s. In the 1990s, the buildings were used to host infamous "underground" raves and techno parties, including the Spastik party hosted by Richie Hawtin. The majority of the property was claimed by the city of Detroit in 1994 after former owners failed to pay back taxes. Parts of the complex continued to operate under the name The Motor City Industrial Complex until 1999 when it was closed by the city.

A number of the outer buildings were in use by businesses up through the early 2000s. In 2010, Chemical Processing announced its intention to vacate the premises after 52 years. This left Krillin Co., a lighting company in Building 22, as the sole remaining tenant. In 2010, a mural by the England-based graffiti artist, Banksy, was discovered in the ruins of the plant. In 2015, the mural, entitled I Remember When All This Was Trees, was sold at an art gallery in Beverly Hills, California, for $137,500. In the 2010s, the site was used as a filming location for many movies and TV shows, including Only Lovers Left Alive, It Follows, and Transformers: The Last Knight.

== Current status ==
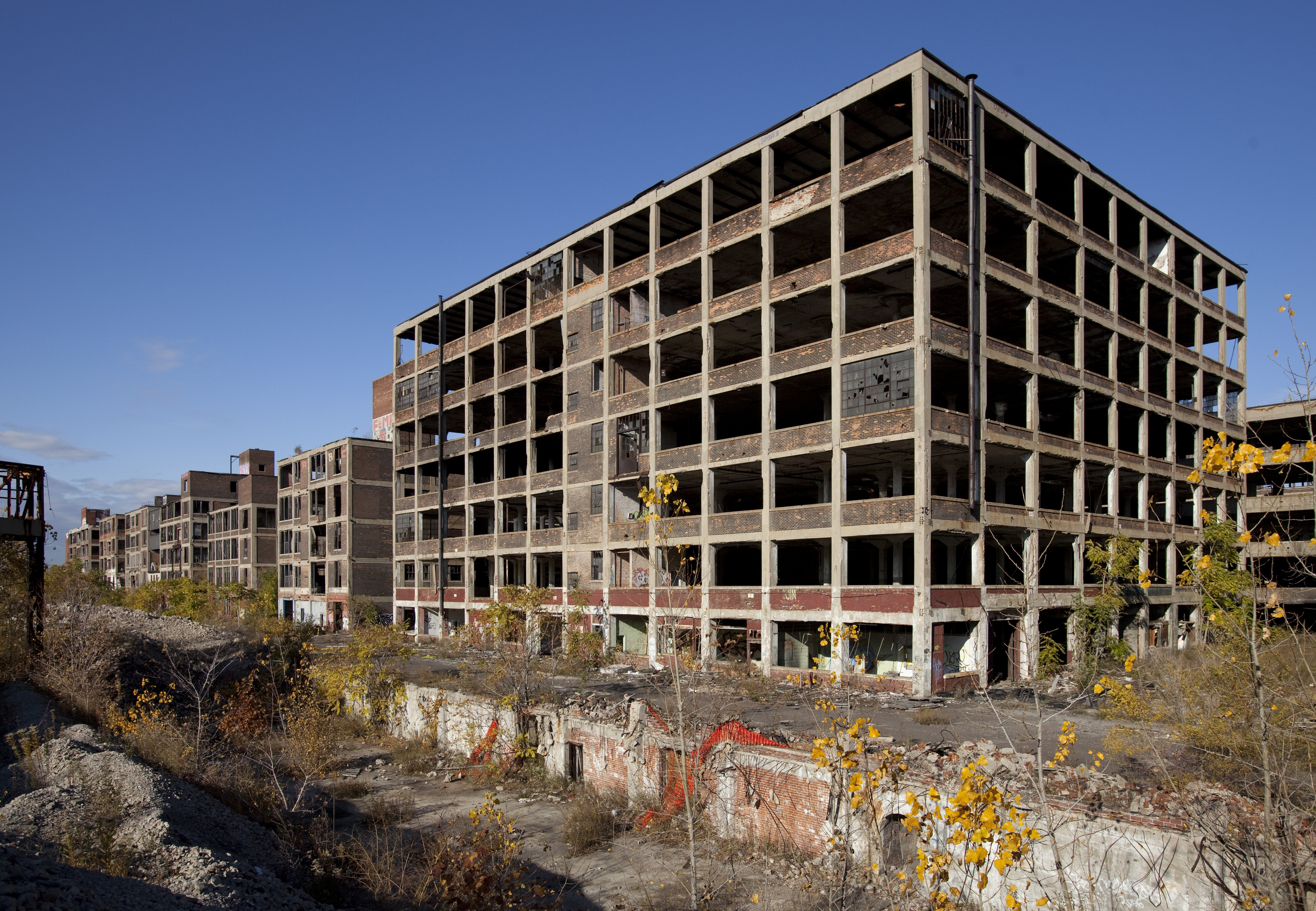
Packard Automotive Plant in 2009

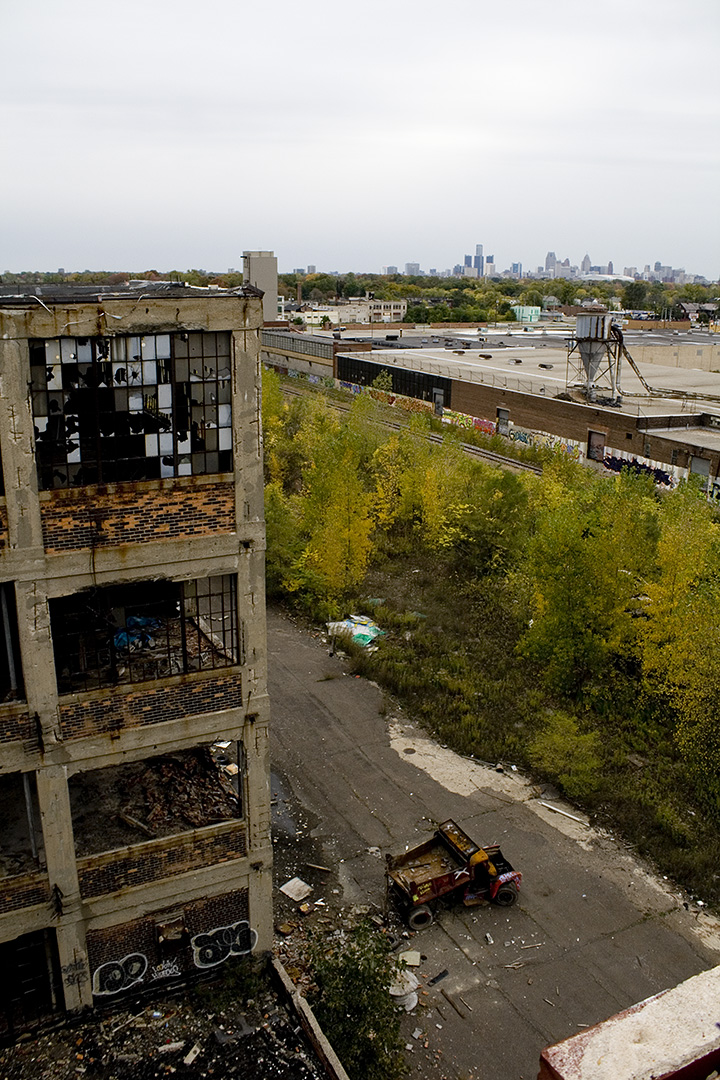
The infamous "Packard Dump Truck" October 13, 2009

Since its abandonment, the plant has been a haven for graffiti artists, urban explorers, paintballers and auto scrappers, and by the early 2010s, most of the wiring and other building materials had been illegally removed from the site. In one incident in 2009, a group of urban explorers pushed a dump truck through an opening on the fourth floor. Karen Nagher, the executive director of the nonprofit organization Preservation Wayne, stated that she was irked to see people come from "all over the world" to poke around Detroit. "Piece by piece, they're disassembling those buildings, making it harder and harder to restore them".

Despite many years of neglect and abuse, the reinforced concrete structures were able to remain mostly intact and structurally sound. Portions of the upper floors of several small sections in various buildings had collapsed or been partly demolished and laid in ruins in the wake of several aborted attempts at demolition over the years. The City of Detroit had pledged legal action to have the property demolished or secured. In early 2012, Dominic Cristini, whose claim of ownership was disputed at the time, was said to have been conducting construction surveys in advance of full-scale demolition.

On February 5, 2013, it was reported that aluminum letter placards spelling the Nazi slogan "Arbeit macht frei" (work makes one free) were placed in the windows of the E. Grand Boulevard bridge. Community volunteers promptly removed the letters. In April 2013, it was announced that AMC's Low Winter Sun would be filming around the location. The Packard Plant was featured briefly in the 2013 film, Only Lovers Left Alive. In June 2018, Amazon's The Grand Tour filmed their first episode of Season 3 in Detroit which prominently showed the Packard Plant; the episode debuted on January 18, 2019.

On January 23, 2019, the E. Grand Boulevard bridge collapsed with no injuries reported. In February 2019 a section of the plant owned by the city of Detroit was demolished.

=== Sale ===
Due to tax delinquency, the 43 parcels composing the plant were put up for auction in September 2013. The starting bid was $975,000 (the amount owed in taxes) and there were no takers.

Another auction in October 2013 posted a starting bid of $21,000, or about $500 per parcel. This auction closed with a top bid of $6,038,000 by Dr. Jill Van Horn, a Texas-based physician who announced in an email that she would team up with "partners and investors from Detroit, Wall Street and international firms," to turn the site into an "economic engine", refurbishing the plant grounds for a manufactured-house assembly facility. However, the deadline for full payment was missed, prompting Wayne County to initiate talks with the second-highest bidder, Bill Hults, a Chicago-area developer who placed a $2,003,000 bid in the October auction. In a separate email, Dr. Van Horn stated, "It seemed (David Szymanski, Deputy Wayne County Treasurer) had already made up his mind to talk to the second bidder". Hults then made several non-refundable down-payments on the plant, but he ultimately failed to raise the entire sum of his bid.

Around the same time in October 2013, a Spanish investor, Fernando Palazuelo, also expressed interest in securing the Packard Plant. It was purchased for $405,000 on December 12, 2013. Palazuelo, who has developed historic buildings in Spain and Peru, planned on moving into the plant by April 9, his 59th birthday. He planned on having six different uses for the Packard Plant Project (residential, retail, offices, light industry, recreation and art), estimated to cost about $350 million over the next 10 to 15 years. He hoped to bring a big-3 automotive-parts manufacturer to the plant in exchange for a few years of free rent. He also hoped to create a work space for local artists and an upscale go-kart track.

As of August 2016, no redevelopment had taken place at the historic 40-acre site on Detroit's east side. At the time, many remained skeptical that the enormous effort would ever succeed — or even get off the ground — given the nearly half-billion-dollar price tag of the project that Palazuelo had envisioned.

=== Renovation ===
In 2014 The Display Group, a Detroit-based event company purchased building 22, a newer addition connected, yet separately owned from Kirlin Co. Spending $750,000 in costs, renovation took over approximately a year to turn the space into the company's new headquarters. Building 22 never fell to the same kind of decay as the rest of the factory, its more modern style and layout as well as historic significance have likely contributed, as did its smaller size and easy ability to partition as an addition. Production of the vaunted Rolls Royce Merlin, or Packard-Merlin as the American-built version of the P-51 engine is sometimes known, took place in building 22.

The Display Group uses Building 22 for audiovisual production, custom prop & display fabrication, warehousing and creative event furniture and decor rentals. The Display Group has since added a full-service digital broadcasting studio to adapt towards the event industry's sudden reliance on streaming. In 2024 Display Group helped produce and broadcast the reopening celebrations for Michigan Central Station, which included a live concert featuring stars such as Diana Ross, Jack White, Faustina, Eminem, Jelly Roll and Trick Trick. The Display Group continues to help with putting on America's Thanksgiving Day Parade in Detroit, as well as being involved in other major recent events like the 2024 NFL Draft, Movement Music Festival and others.

In May 2017, Arte Express, the holding company for Palazuelo, held a ground breaking ceremony for phase I of the project which would include the former 121,000-square-foot administrative building on the site. On August 12, 2017, the inaugural public tour of the property was conducted, which included access to the second floor of the administration building on the complex's western side.

=== Bust and demolition ===
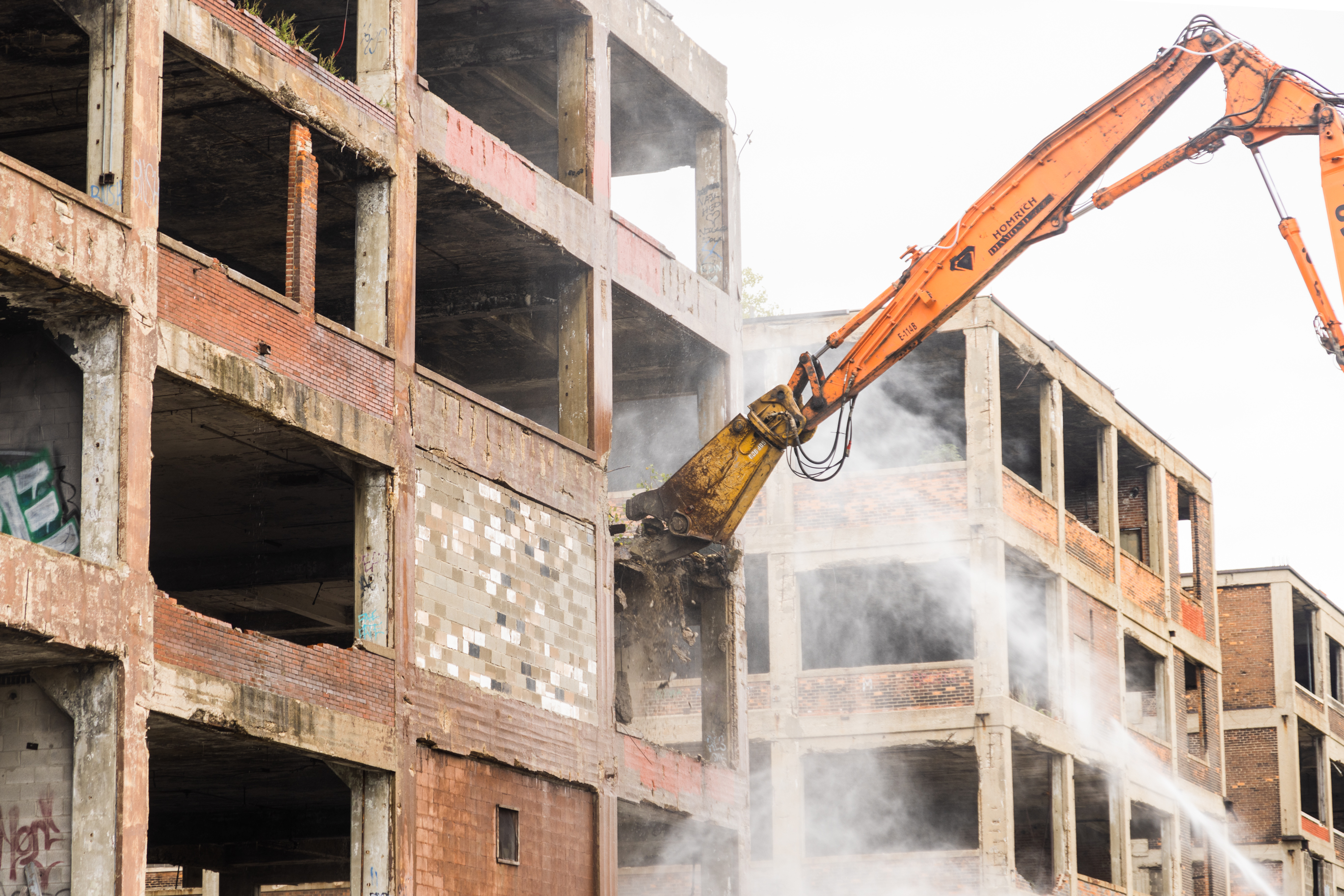
Partial demolition underway in 2022

The city demolished several structures on parcels it owned at the Packard Plant in 2017. In October 2020, it was announced that the original redevelopment vision for the site had been abandoned, and Palazuelo would be placing the property up for sale, with an eye toward large-scale demolition to repurpose the site for industrial use.

On April 7, 2022, Wayne County Circuit Court Judge Brian Sullivan ordered the demolition of the Packard auto plant in Detroit, finding that it had become a public nuisance. The city began a search for contractors in May 2022. In late July 2022, Detroit City Council approved a nearly $1.7 million contract for the demolition of a portion of the Packard Plant.

On October 27, 2022, demolition began on building 21 of the northern complex; building 21 had been noted as "Leaning" on an occupied building, and causing structural damages. Demolition finished by the end of December; however, some remnants remained.

On January 24, 2023, the city began demolishing a second portion of the plant, building 28, of the southern complex. By the end of March, demolition of building 28 was successful, and all rubble was transported away from the site. However, by early April, it was revealed that the city halted all demolition operations at the Packard Plant, including the (then) ongoing demolition of building 21. The absentee owner was able to pay their property taxes before the deadline came, which allowed them to secure their ownership of the privately owned sections of the Packard Plant. As of early April, new "NO TRESSPASSING/PRIVATELY OWNED" signs have been posted at every privately owned parcel. The city of Detroit may not have the rights to proceed with demolition anymore. The city stated that they will save some buildings of the Packard Plant in order to preserve history but will continue to demolish other portions of the plant throughout 2023.

On March 4, 2024 demolition began again. Concluding the demolition of buildings 34 to 38 at the southernmost end of the complex, preceding the demolition of largest buildings, 1-19, excluding 13. On October 10th, the building's iconic southern water tower was toppled by two guy-wires. The City of Detroit, using funds from the American Rescue Plan, expects to clear the site before the end of 2024. Two of the facades of the structure, administrative building 13 and building 27, that face each other across E. Grand Boulevard, will be preserved for their historical significance.

By late December 2024, all structural components of the plant had been razed, except for two adjacent sections along E. Grand Boulevard which are slated for preservation.

== See also ==
- Ford Piquette Avenue Plant
