= Ralph C. Martin =

American academic and religious leader

Ralph Martin
- Education: University of Notre Dame (BA); Sacred Heart Major Seminary (MA); Pontifical Faculty of the Immaculate Conception (STL); Pontifical University of Saint Thomas Aquinas (STD)
- Occupations: Professor, speaker
- Theological work
- Main interests: Charismatic renewal
- Website: renewalministries.net

Ralph C. Martin is a former professor at Sacred Heart Major Seminary and was involved in the early Catholic charismatic renewal as founder of the Word of God (community) and cofounder of the Sword of the Spirit association of covenant communities.

== Biography ==
Martin was raised Catholic, but having fallen away from religion as a youth, he was returned to Catholicism by a Cursillo retreat he attended as a college student. Martin and Stephen B. Clark, who would also become a leader in the charismatic renewal, worked for the National Secretariat of the Cursillo from 1965 to 1970. During a Cursillo retreat in 1966, Martin and Clark recommended The Cross and the Switchblade to certain retreatants from Duquesne University. The book inspired one of these retreatants, Ralph W. Keifer, along with history professor William G. Storey, to lead a retreat on the Holy Spirit for Duquesne students. This retreat, the Duquesne Weekend, in turn gave rise to the Catholic charismatic renewal, through which Martin was soon baptized in the Holy Spirit. Martin and Clark then began hosting prayer meetings in Ann Arbor, Michigan, which would eventually develop into the Word of God community.

Martin was invited to Belgium by Cardinal Leo Joseph Suenens to help jumpstart the Catholic charismatic renewal in Europe.

In 2011, Pope Benedict XVI appointed Martin to a five-year term as a consultor to the Pontifical Council for Promoting the New Evangelization. Martin is currently the president of Renewal Ministries, and lives in Ann Arbor with his wife, Anne.

== Selected works ==
- Hungry for God (Doubleday & Company, 1974)
- A Crisis Of Truth (Servant Books, 1982)
- The Fulfillment of All Desire (Emmaus Road Publishing, 2006)
- Will Many Be Saved?: What Vatican II Actually Teaches and Its Implications for the New Evangelization (Eerdmans, 2012)
- A Church in Crisis: Pathways Forward (Emmaus Road Publishing, 2020)
