= Rockhurst University =

Private university in Kansas City, Missouri, US

Coordinates: 39°01′54″N 94°34′21″W

- Former name: Rockhurst College (1910–1998)
- Motto: Sapientia Aedificavit Sibi Domum (Latin)
- Motto in English: Wisdom has built herself a home
- Type: Private
- Established: 1910; 116 years ago
- Accreditation: HLC
- Religious affiliation: Roman Catholic (Jesuit)
- Academic affiliations: Association of Jesuit Colleges and Universities
- Endowment: $35.8 million (2020)
- President: Sandra Cassady
- Students: 3,338 (fall 2025)
- Undergraduates: 1,964 (fall 2025)
- Postgraduates: 1,374 (fall 2025)
- Location: Kansas City, Missouri, U.S.
- Campus: Urban, 55 acres (22.3 ha)
- Colors: Blue & white
- Nickname: Hawks
- Sporting affiliations: NCAA Division II – GLVC
- Mascot: Hawk
- Website: rockhurst.edu
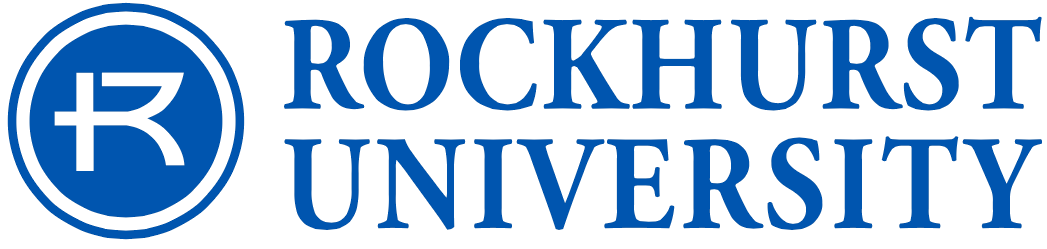

Rockhurst University is a private Jesuit university in Kansas City, Missouri. Founded in 1910 as Rockhurst College, Rockhurst University is accredited by the Higher Learning Commission. It enrolled 2,980 students in 2019.

== History ==
In 1909, Fr. Michael Dowling, S.J., the founder of Rockhurst, purchased 25 acres (10.1 ha) of land at 53rd Street and Troost Avenue in Kansas City, Missouri for $50,000. Rockhurst was chartered by the state as Rockhurst College in August 1910. It included the Academy of Rockhurst College, an institution of secondary education which became Rockhurst High School in 1923, though the two remained under a single corporate umbrella until the high school moved onto its own campus in 1962.

Sedgwick Hall was constructed in 1914, allowing the opening of high school classes, and college classes began in 1917, all held within the same building. The first Rockhurst University students were all taught by Alphonse Schwitalla. The first class graduated in 1921. In 1939, Rockhurst was granted accreditation by the North Central Association. In 1969, all divisions of Rockhurst became coeducational. Its name change to Rockhurst University became official on July 1, 1999. In October 2006, Rockhurst officially installed its fourteenth president, Thomas Curran, a Catholic priest and the school's first non-Jesuit president. In May 2015, Curran took his finals vows to become a Jesuit. Rockhurst and Research College of Nursing jointly announced in 2018 that they were ending their partnership. In 2020, Saint Luke's College of Health Sciences merged with Rockhurst University to form the Saint Luke's College of Nursing and Health Sciences at Rockhurst University.

== Service education ==
Rockhurst University adheres to a traditional Ignatian philosophy of educating students not only in academics, but in leadership and service as well. The university stresses a values and ethics based education with an emphasis on lifelong learning. Graduates from Rockhurst University receive two transcripts: one for academics and another for community service. 97% of all students participate in community service, and every year students complete over 25,000 hours of service to the Kansas City area and worldwide community. Before classes even begin in the fall, the freshmen class joins with upperclassmen and university Regents for the Finucane Service Project as part of the Orientation program. Over 550 people participated in the Finucane project last fall, logging over 1,200 hours of service in a two-hour period. The university sponsors numerous annual service trips within the United States, as well as in Guatemala, Belize, Ecuador, Honduras, Mexico, El Salvador, The Bahamas and other developing countries.

In recognition of its dedication to community service programs, including the number of people who participate in service and the number of service-learning courses, Rockhurst was recognized on the 2008 President's Higher Education Community Service Honor Roll with Distinction, among only 127 schools in the country and one of nine Jesuit schools to receive that honor. Rockhurst has continued to receive this distinction every year since 2007.

In addition to the service completed by its student body, Rockhurst has been recognized as a university by the Carnegie Foundation for the Advancement of Teaching with the foundation's community engagement classification for its ongoing engagement with its neighborhood and the Kansas City community. Rockhurst was first school in the Kansas City area to receive this honor.

== Campus ==
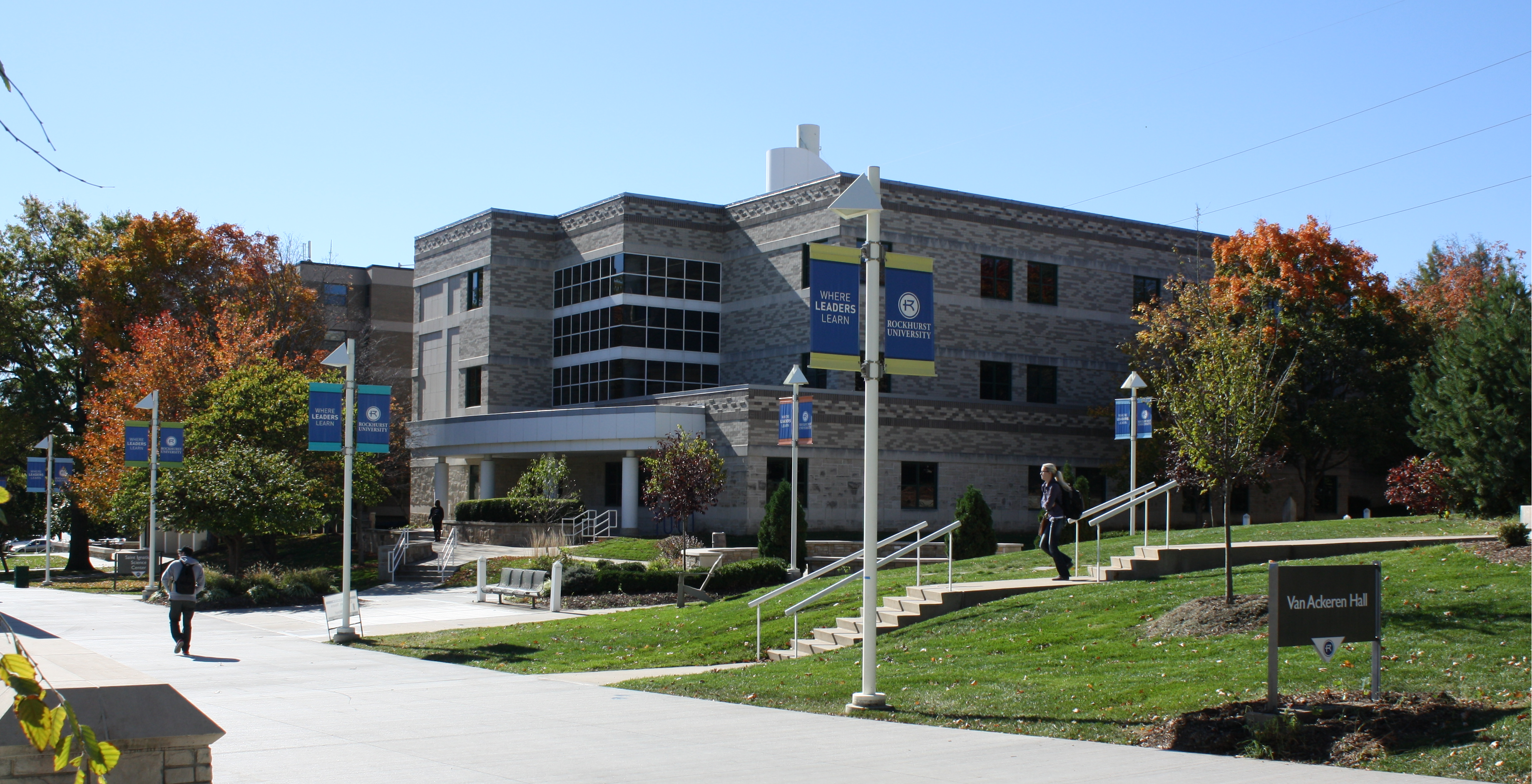
Ignatius Science Center

Rockhurst sits on a 40-acre (16.2 ha) campus located in Kansas City's cultural district, a short distance from the popular shopping and dining center, Country Club Plaza, and just across Troost Avenue from the neighboring University of Missouri–Kansas City.

=== Housing ===
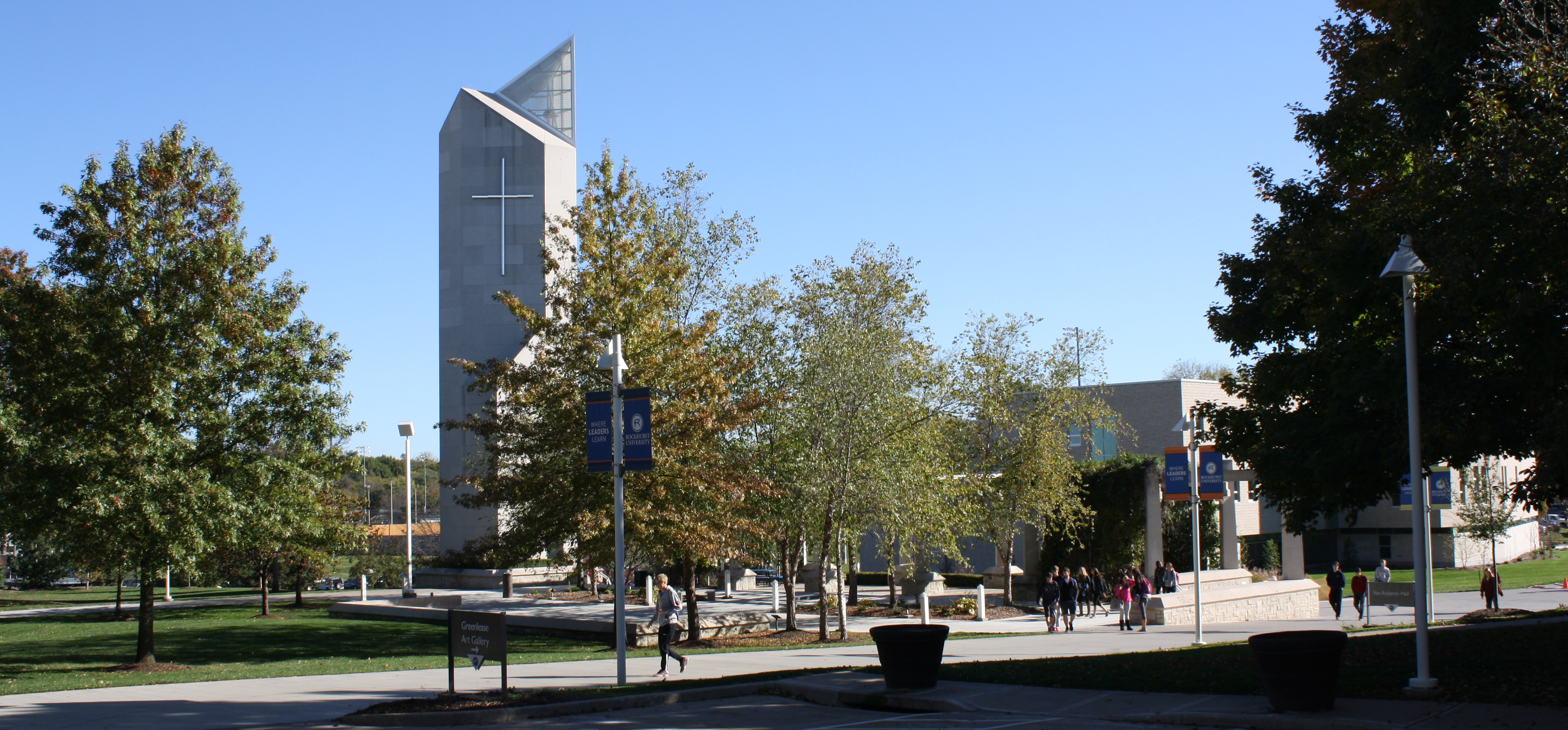
The university's central tower

The campus is home to three residence halls and the Townhouse Village, offering housing for interested students, as well as university-owned houses on two streets adjacent to campus. McGee Hall typically houses only freshmen women, while Corcoran Hall houses primarily freshmen men. Upper-class students can also apply to live in university-owned houses on residential streets adjacent to campus.

=== The quad ===
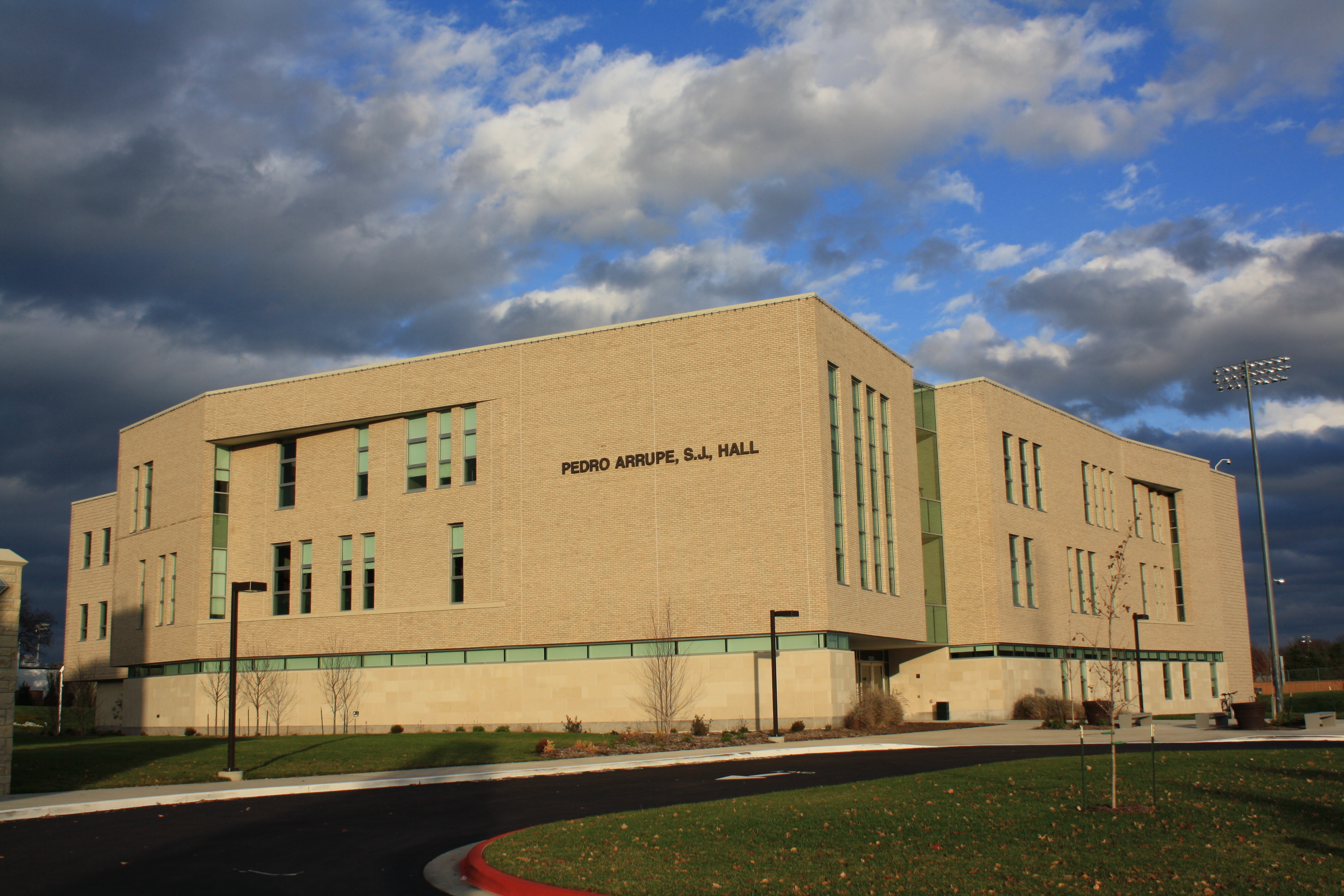
Arrupe Hall

The main area of campus, including all classroom buildings, surrounds the quad with the monumental Rockhurst bell tower and adjacent pergola flanking one end. In 2007 the quad has been renamed the Kinerk Commons by the university, in honor of Edward Kinerk, the thirteenth president of the university. Conway Hall is home to the Helzberg School of Management, the university finance office, and university computer services. Sedgwick Hall contains classrooms and faculty offices as well as the Mabee Theatre, where the university's players have put on four productions each year. The Greenlease Library holds the school's volumes of reference books and periodicals. The science center, built in 1996, holds the science classrooms and labs, as well as the doctoral program in physical therapy and doctoral program in occupational therapy. VanAckeren Hall holds the education department, the learning center (open to all students for free tutoring and writing help), and career services, which helps students find jobs and internships across the Midwest. Massman Hall is the center of the campus, both physically and organizationally.

A major addition to the Rockhurst campus was Arrupe Hall, opening in August 2015, a classroom and faculty office building which includes a 500-seat auditorium. It features versatile classrooms accommodating modern teaching methods and technologies and has a variety of small gathering spaces along the corridors to facilitate sharing and friendship among the students. It was also built with a view to energy conservation and openness to natural light. Its name honors the vision of Jesuit Superior General Pedro Arrupe who coined the term "men and women for others" that has become integral to Jesuit education, and who "called the Society to the service of faith and the promotion of justice. His call clearly resonates with the message from (Jesuit) Pope Francis."

=== Athletic facilities ===
The campus has several athletic facilities, including the soccer stadium, recently renovated with new grass-like turf, a baseball stadium, softball field, and a tennis complex. The Mason-Halpin Fieldhouse holds the basketball and volleyball court, and the adjacent Convocation Center contains a multipurpose court and racquetball courts. The Magis Activity Center, built in 2019, houses workout facilities for students and faculty.

=== Religious worship facilities ===
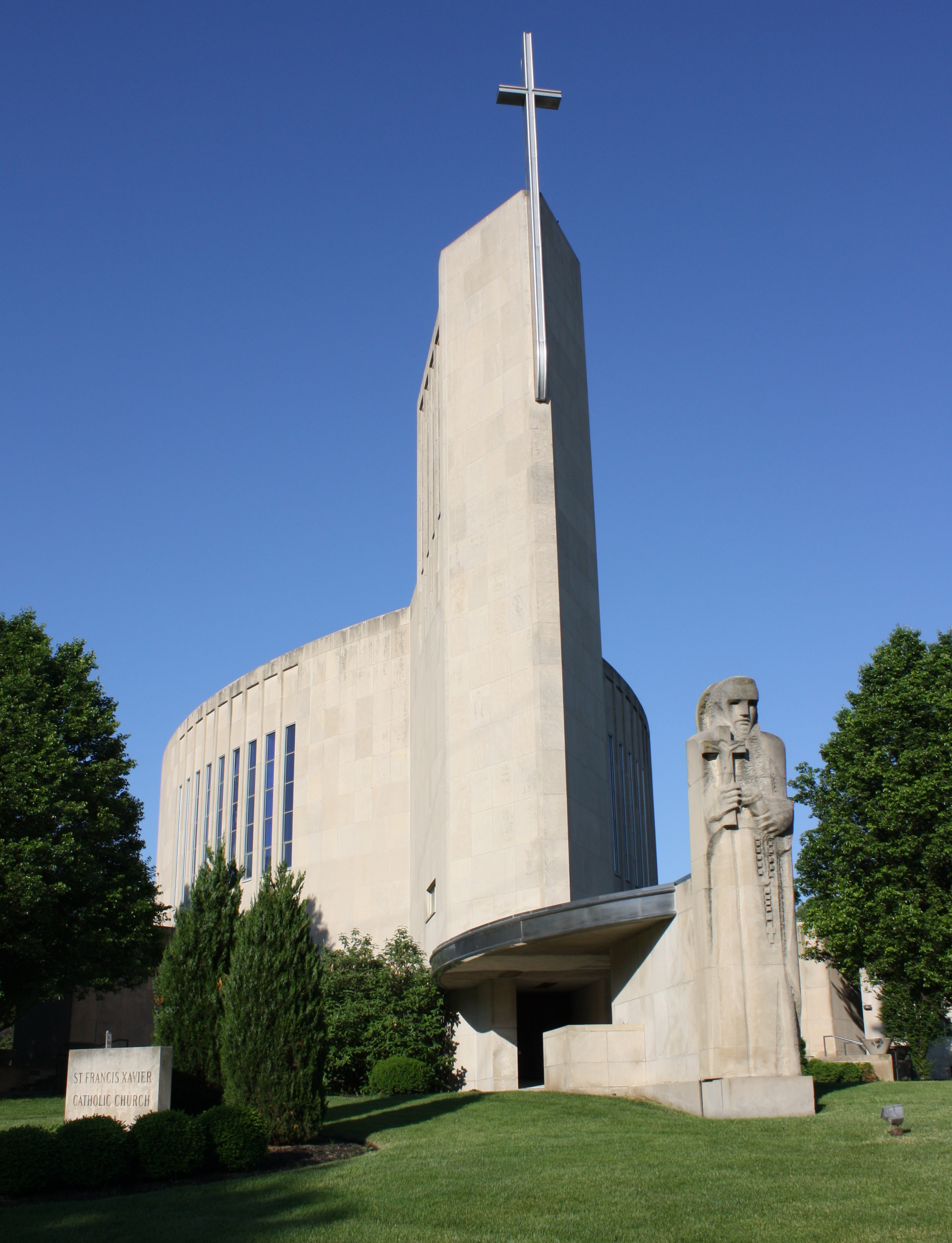
St. Francis Xavier Church at Rockhurst

The Campus Ministry Center (CMC) is located in a house adjacent to campus. The CMC is used by the many Campus Ministry programs for their weekly meetings and activities, including the Christian Life Communities (CLCs), student-led faith sharing and reflection groups. Within Massman Hall is the Mabee Chapel, where daily mass is held each school day, and where student devotional prayer and praise-and-worship groups meet weekly. Across the street from campus is St. Francis Xavier Church, a Jesuit parish church, used by the university for student masses every Sunday evening.

== Academics ==
Academic rankings

Regional
- U.S. News & World Report: 11

Rockhurst University offers over fifty graduate and undergraduate programs, serving over 3,000 students annually. The core undergraduate curriculum is designed to shape students into leaders who are engaged in the world around them in whatever path they choose, and the graduate programs aim to prepare professional leaders with a hands-on curriculum, nationally recognized faculty and flexible schedules. Rockhurst University operates under one president, but has the following schools with their own deans or directors: College of Arts and Sciences, College of Business, Influence, and Information Analysis, and Saint Luke's College of Nursing and Health Sciences.

In 2018, U.S. News & World Report ranked Rockhurst University as the 11th best institution among Midwest regional universities, up from No. 15 in previous years. The Helzberg School of Management earned several top accolades, including the school's undergraduate management program listed at No. 11 (tied with the University of Notre Dame), and the undergraduate quantitative analysis program listed at No. 9 (one spot behind the University of Michigan).

== Campus ministry ==
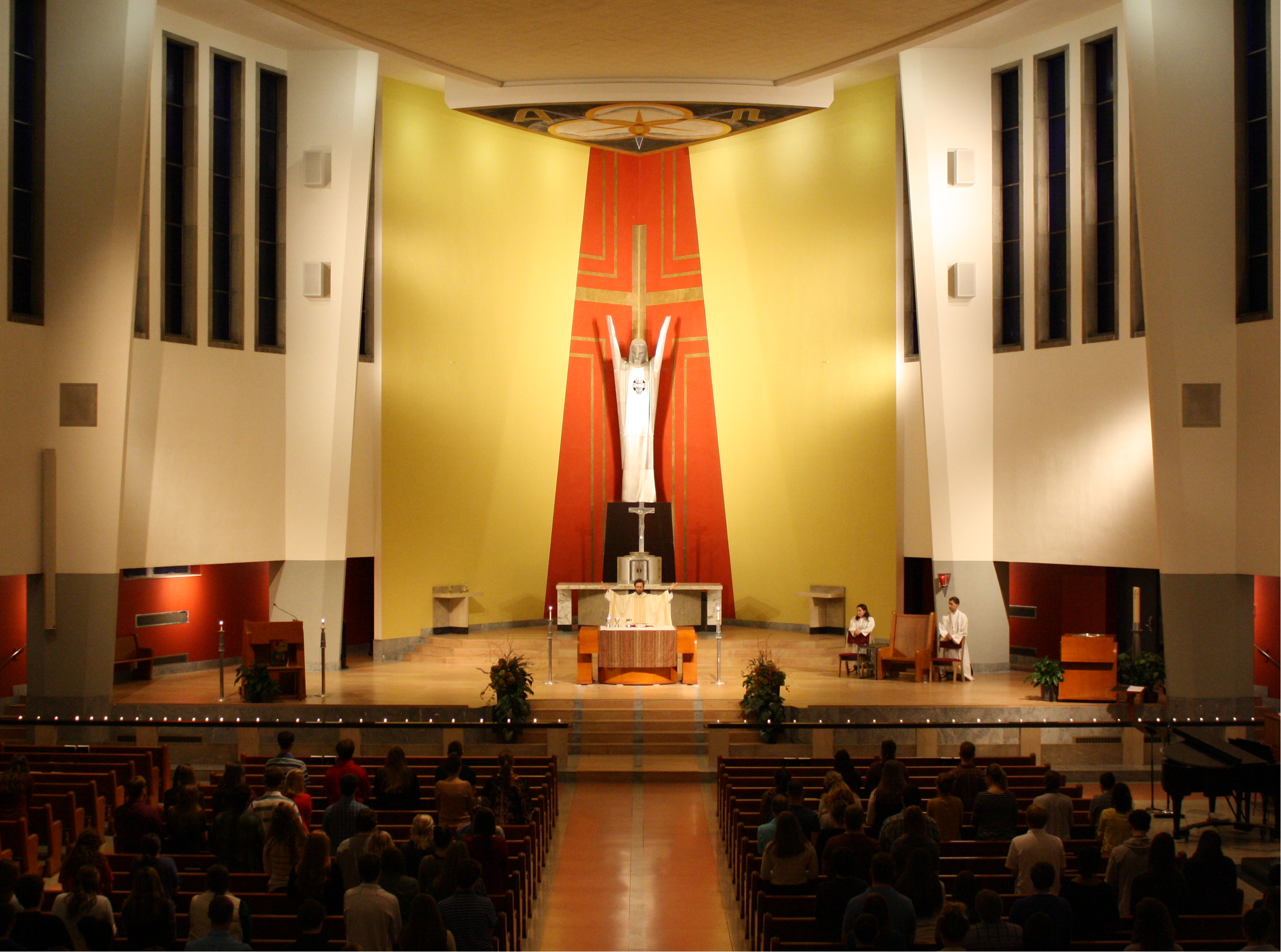
Sunday student Mass

Rockhurst University's campus ministry offers many opportunities for students and staff to live out the school's Catholic, Jesuit tradition. They offer daily mass in the Mabee Chapel every weekday at noon, as well as a student mass every Sunday at 6:00 pm at St. Francis Xavier Parish. Campus ministry also offers RCIA to any interested students.

Christian Life Communities (CLCs) are student-led faith-sharing and reflection groups that meet for an hour each week as small groups. Unity, a gay-straight alliance that meets weekly for prayer, support and service, is open to students of all faith traditions and sexual orientations. Voices for Justice is a student-led social justice group that explores the justice implications of Christianity and raises awareness of social justice issues on campus and beyond. People for People is a group of students exploring issues relating to the respect for life.

The Campus Ministry Center (CMC) is a house located just off-campus across Rockhurst Road from Conway Hall. Christian Life Communities, Voices for Justice, Unity, and People for People all hold their meetings in the CMC, and Campus Ministry offers several social activities in the CMC during the school year.

=== Retreats ===
Campus Ministry runs several different retreat programs during the academic year. The Frosh Getaway, offered annually on a September weekend, is an opportunity for freshmen, led by sophomore leaders, to get to know their new classmates and to adjust to college life with a fun stress-free weekend. The Retreat on the Rock is designed as a college adaptation of Kairos-style retreats. The Fifth Week Retreat is intended as a follow-up to Kairos, Search, TEC, Retreat on the Rock, or similar style retreats, offering ample time for personal reflection and group discussion. The Busy Persons Retreat, offered annually in the spring, is an opportunity for spiritual guidance and reflection within the context and schedule demands of daily college life. The SuperNatural Christian's retreat is a six-day backpacking retreat in upper Michigan's Sylvania Wilderness Tract. This retreat is offered biannually along with the Lumberjack Service Retreat, which offers students the chance to travel to Michigan's Keweenaw Peninsula (specifically the town of Hancock) and chop wood for elderly residents of the area.

== Athletics ==
Rockhurst University is home to the Hawks, the university's athletic program. After a generation in the NAIA, Rockhurst University joined NCAA Division II in 1999, as a founder of the Heartland Conference. In 2005 it moved to the Great Lakes Valley Conference. In July 2009 the Mid-America Intercollegiate Athletics Association (MIAA) rejected a proposal for Rockhurst to join the conference to compete with geographically closer teams. The MIAA said at that moment it currently did not want to expand beyond 12 teams.

Rockhurst has 15 varsity athletic teams, including men's and women's basketball, cross country, soccer, golf, lacrosse and tennis, men's baseball, women's softball, and women's volleyball. The school also offers two club sports: tennis and the Spirit Squad, composed of the Dance Team and the coed cheerleading squad. It is a popular joke around campus that the Rockhurst University football team has remained undefeated since 1949 (the year that the team was dissolved).

== Student activities ==
Rockhurst students participate in many diverse activities throughout the school year both on campus and within the wider community.

=== Greek life ===
Rockhurst's Greek life consists of five fraternities and four sororities (totaling over 30% of the undergraduate population).

== Notable alumni ==
- Hector Barreto Jr., B.S.B.A., 21st Administrator of the U.S. Small Business Administration
- Tom Dempsey, restaurateur, current Republican State Senator
- Wild Bill Elliott, B-Western star best known for playing Red Ryder
- Tommy Frevert, American football player
- Diego Gutierrez, '05, midfielder for the Major League Soccer team Chicago Fire
- Tommy Heinemann, '09, forward for the USL First Division (USL-1) team Charleston Battery
- Herbert Harris, B.A. '48, former member of the United States House of Representatives
- Sly James, B.A. '80, Kansas City mayor
- James B. Kring, University of Massachusetts & University of Florida entomology professor
- Mark Lamping, B.A., former President of the St. Louis Cardinals baseball team, now CEO of the Meadowlands Stadium Company
- Phillip H. Muller, Permanent Representative of the Republic of the Marshall Islands to the United Nations
- Walter Ong, S.J., B.A. '33, philosopher
- G. Joseph Pierron, '68, American judge serving on the Kansas Court of Appeals.
- Bill Reardon, B.A. '63, former Kansas State Representative
- Joe Reardon, '90, 27th Mayor of the City of Kansas City, Kansas
- Michael P. Ryan, Marine Major general
- Joseph P. Teasdale, former Governor of Missouri
- Denny Thum, '74, former President of the National Football League's Kansas City Chiefs.
- Josh Tols, baseball pitcher
- Joseph J. Urusemal, '76, sixth President of the Federated States of Micronesia
- George Wendt, B.A. '71, actor best known for his portrayal of "Norm" on the sitcom Cheers

== Gallery ==
Rockhurst University Campus
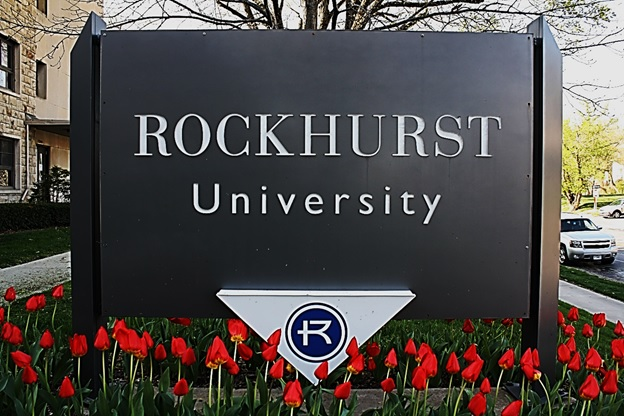
Sign on Troost Ave.

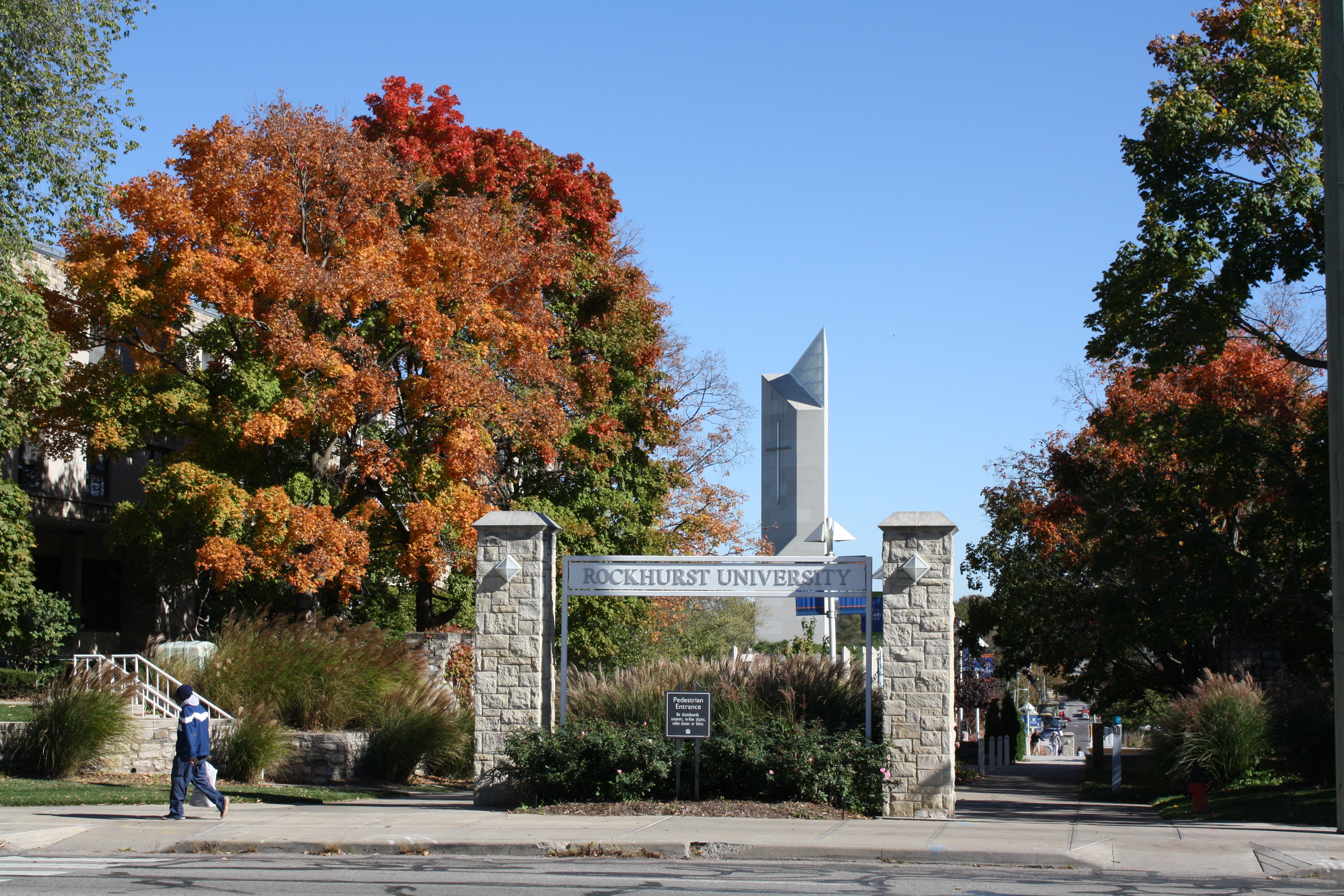
West central entrance

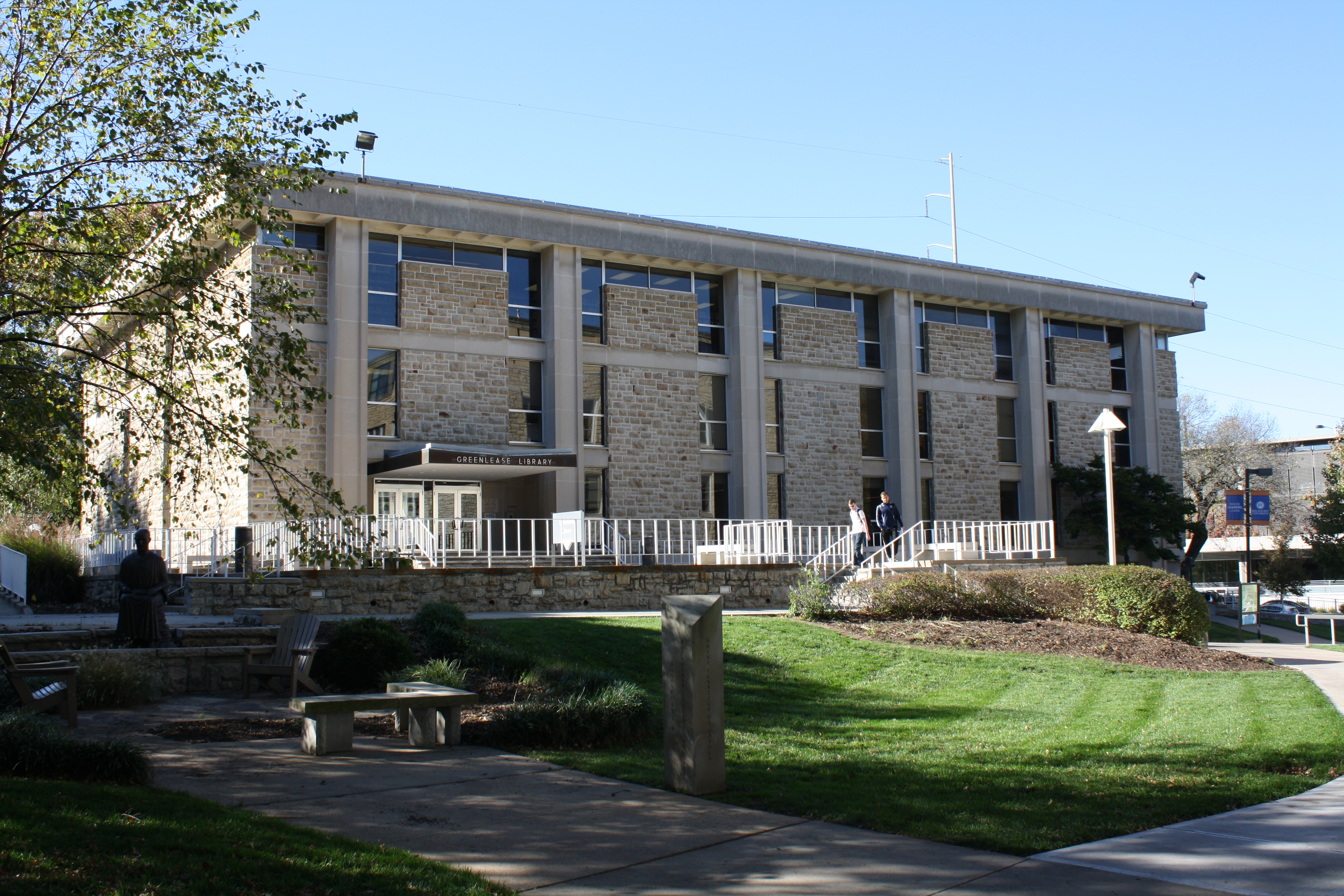
Greenlease Library

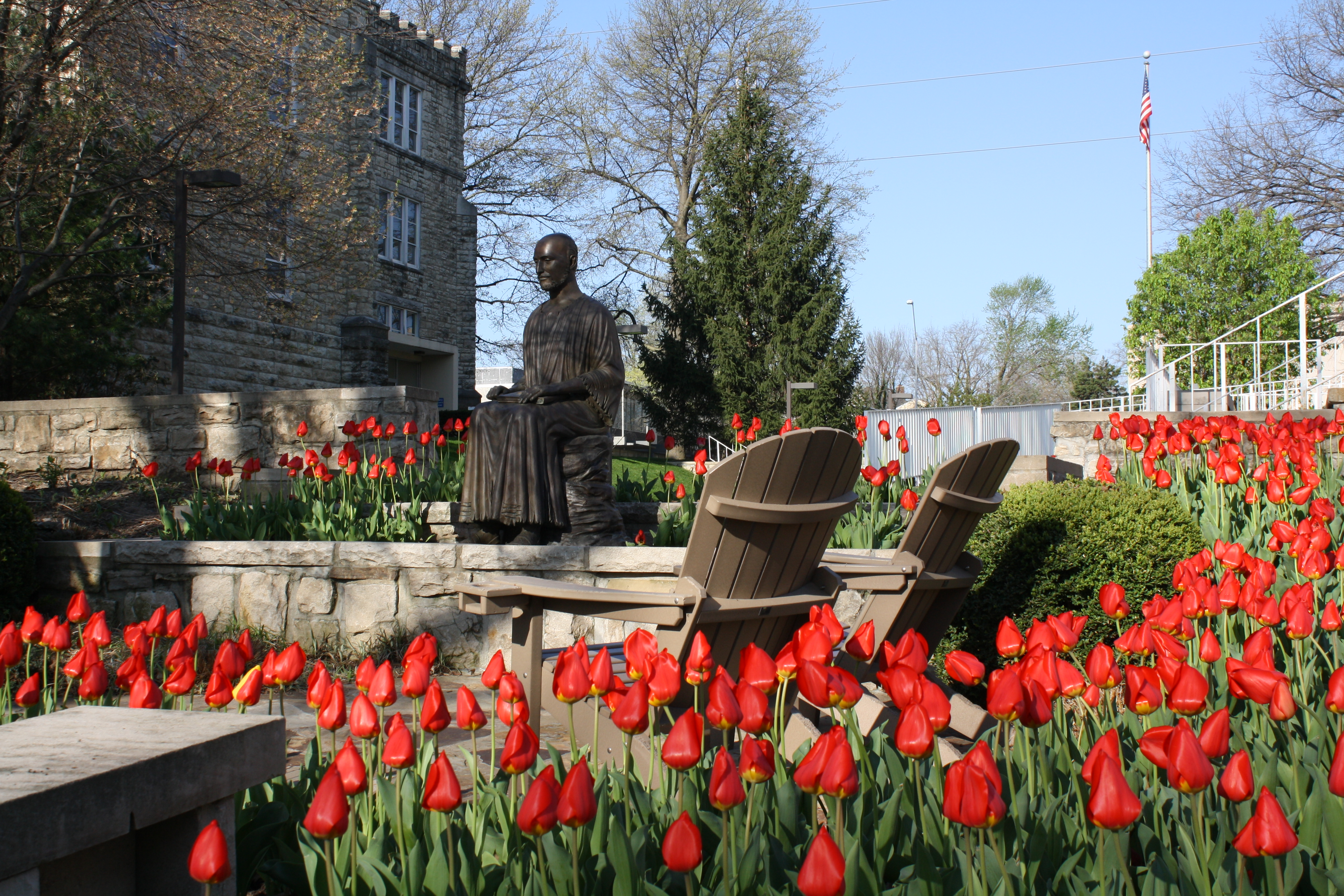
Ignatius Grotto

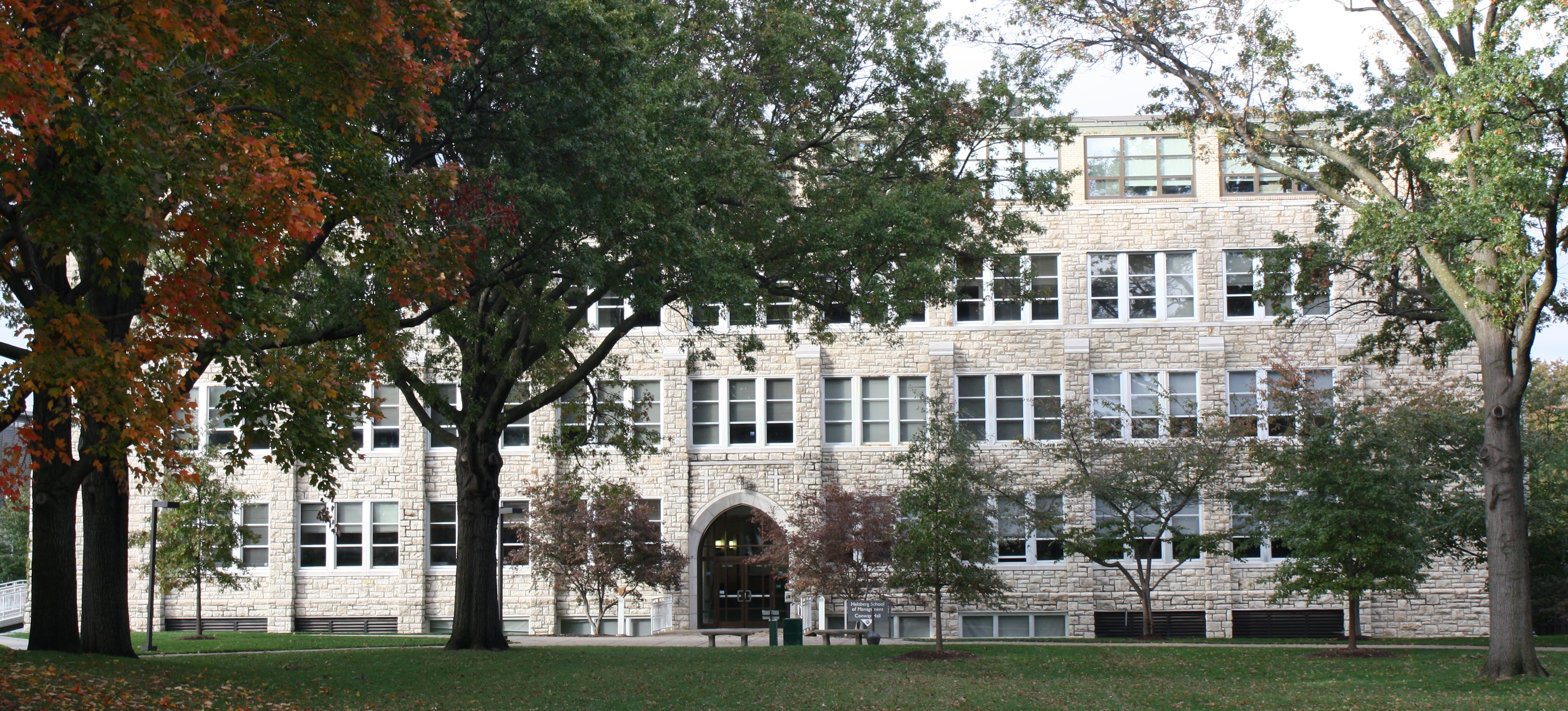
Conway Hall: human resources

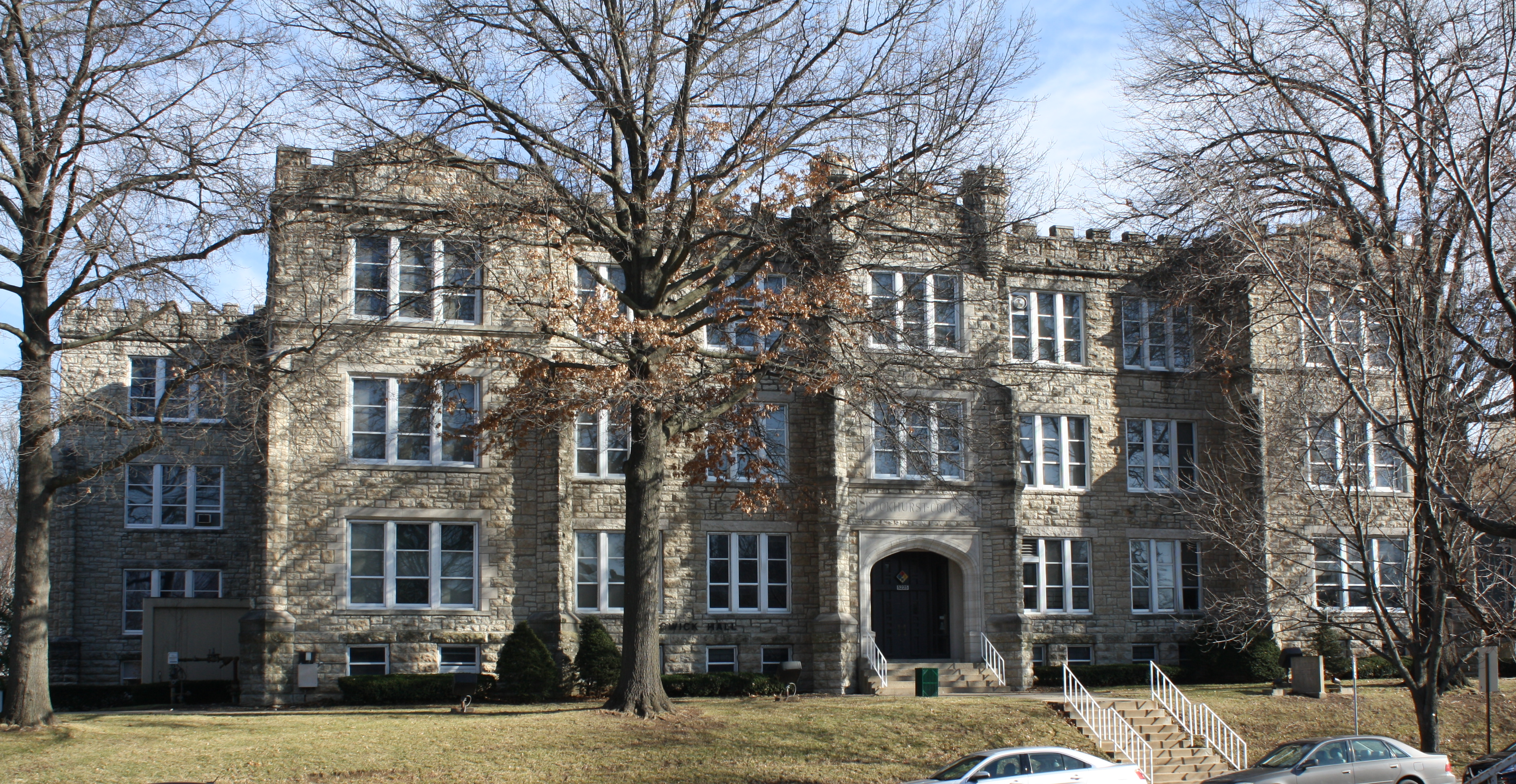
Sedgwick: once Rockhurst High

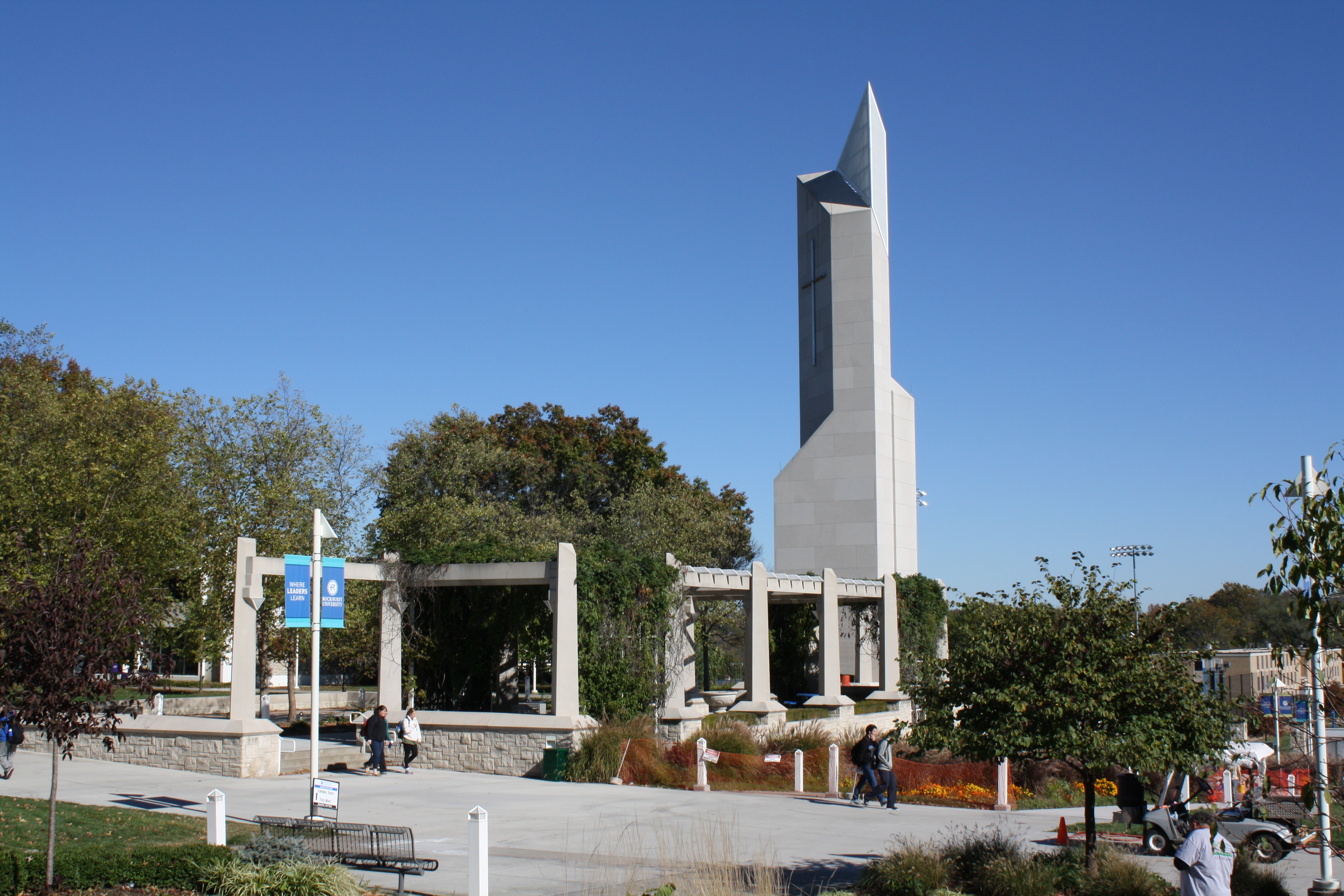
Tower, grotto, and fountain

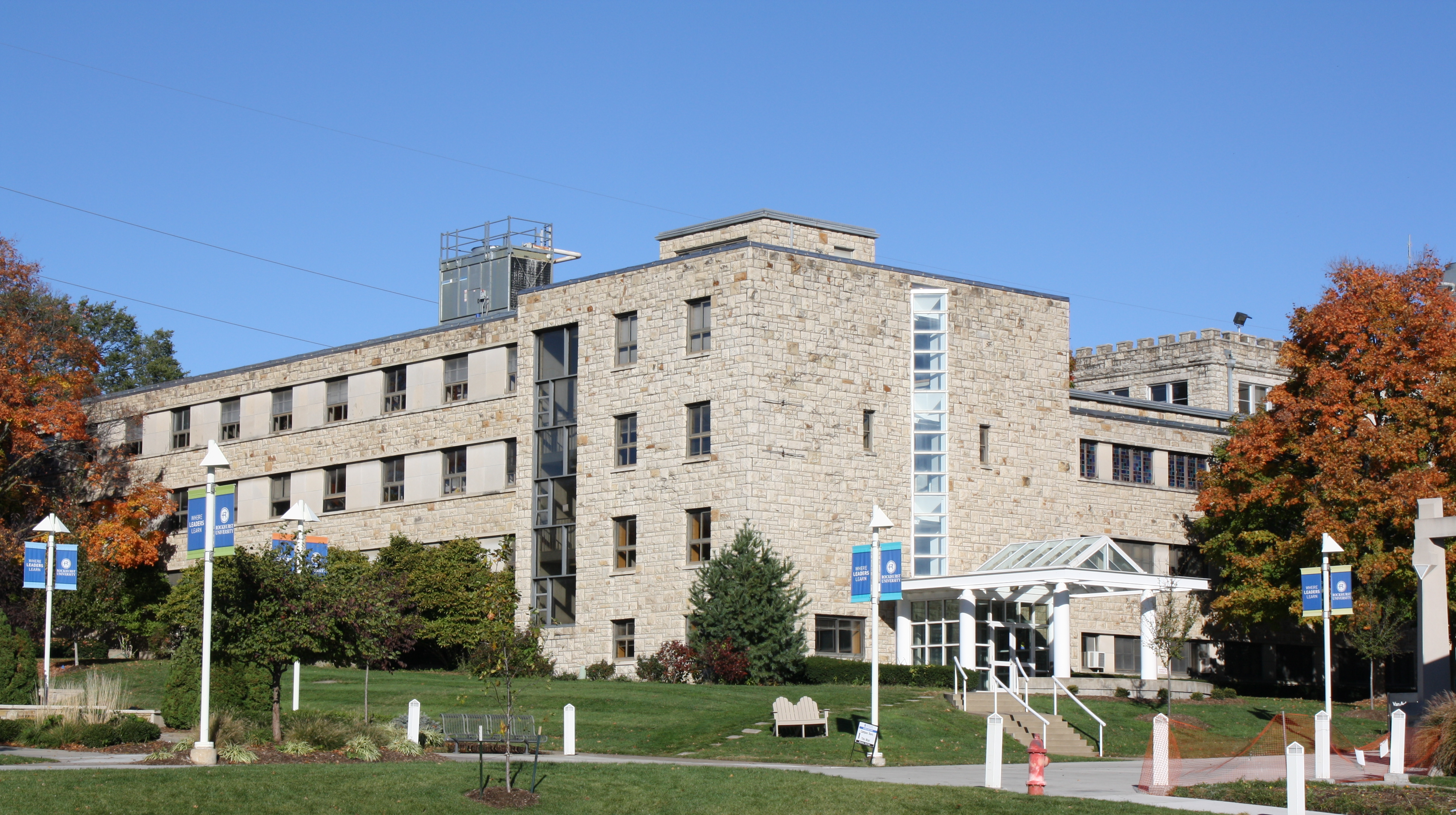
Van Ackeren Hall

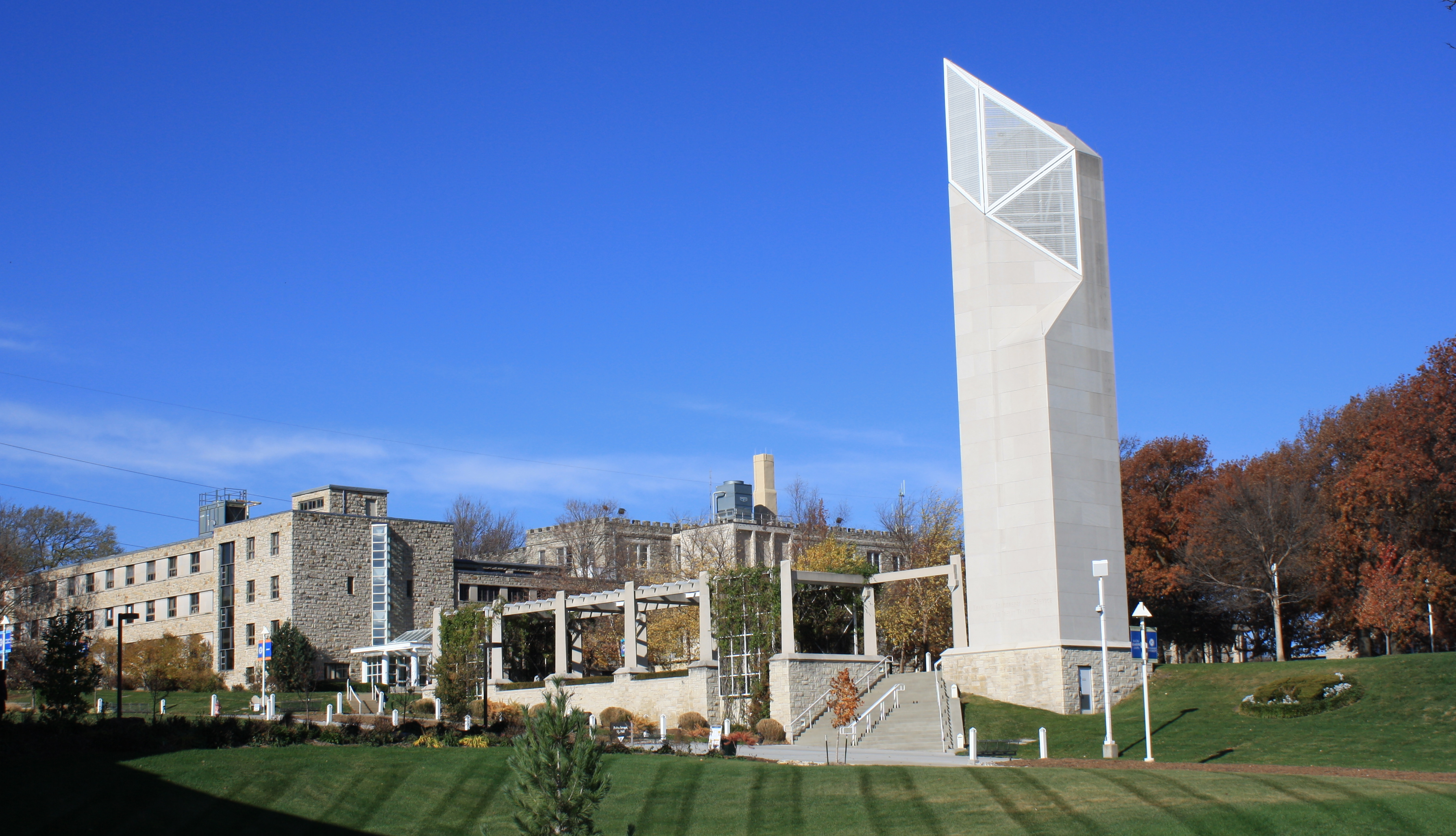
Van Ackeren Hall & Memorial

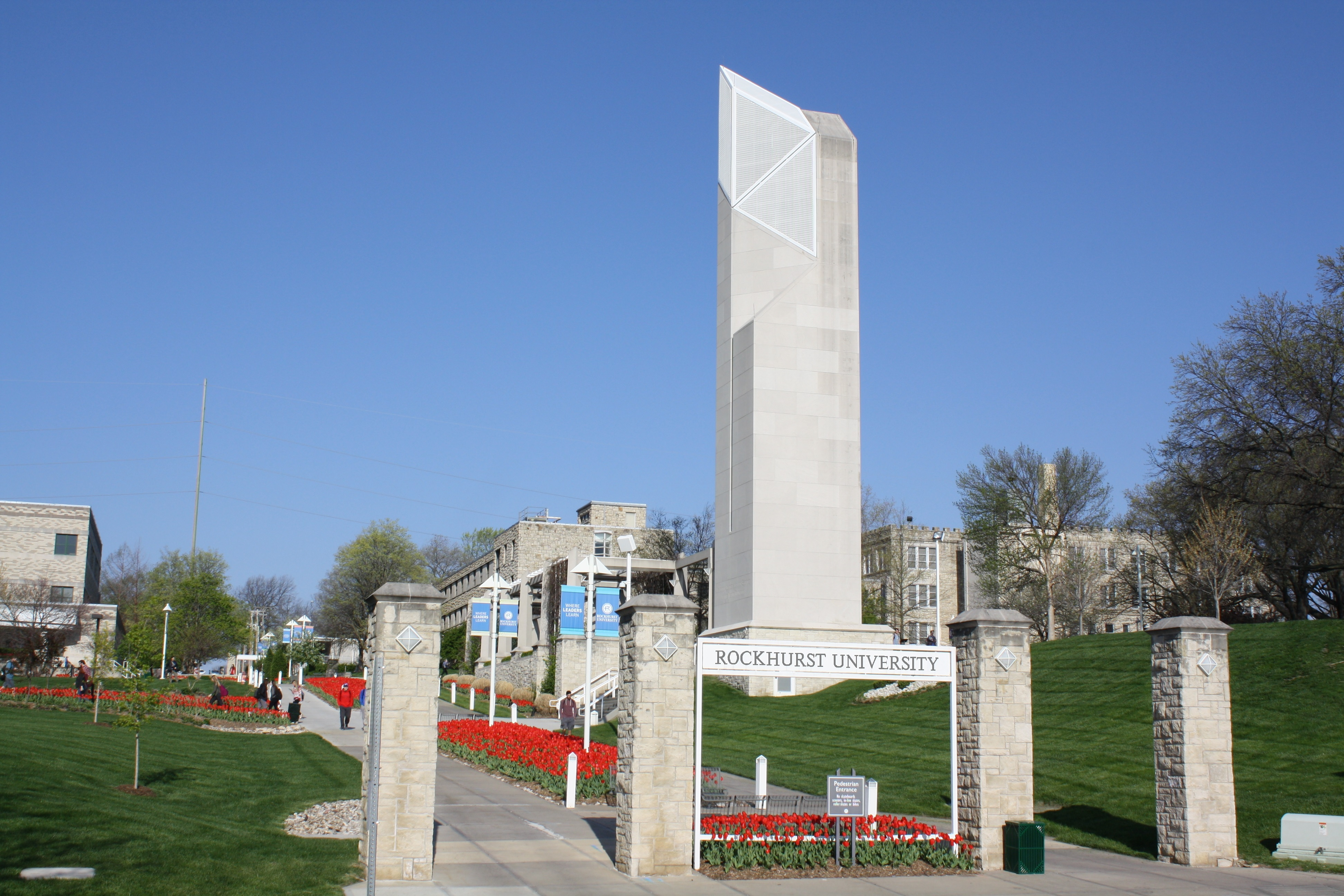
East Entrance

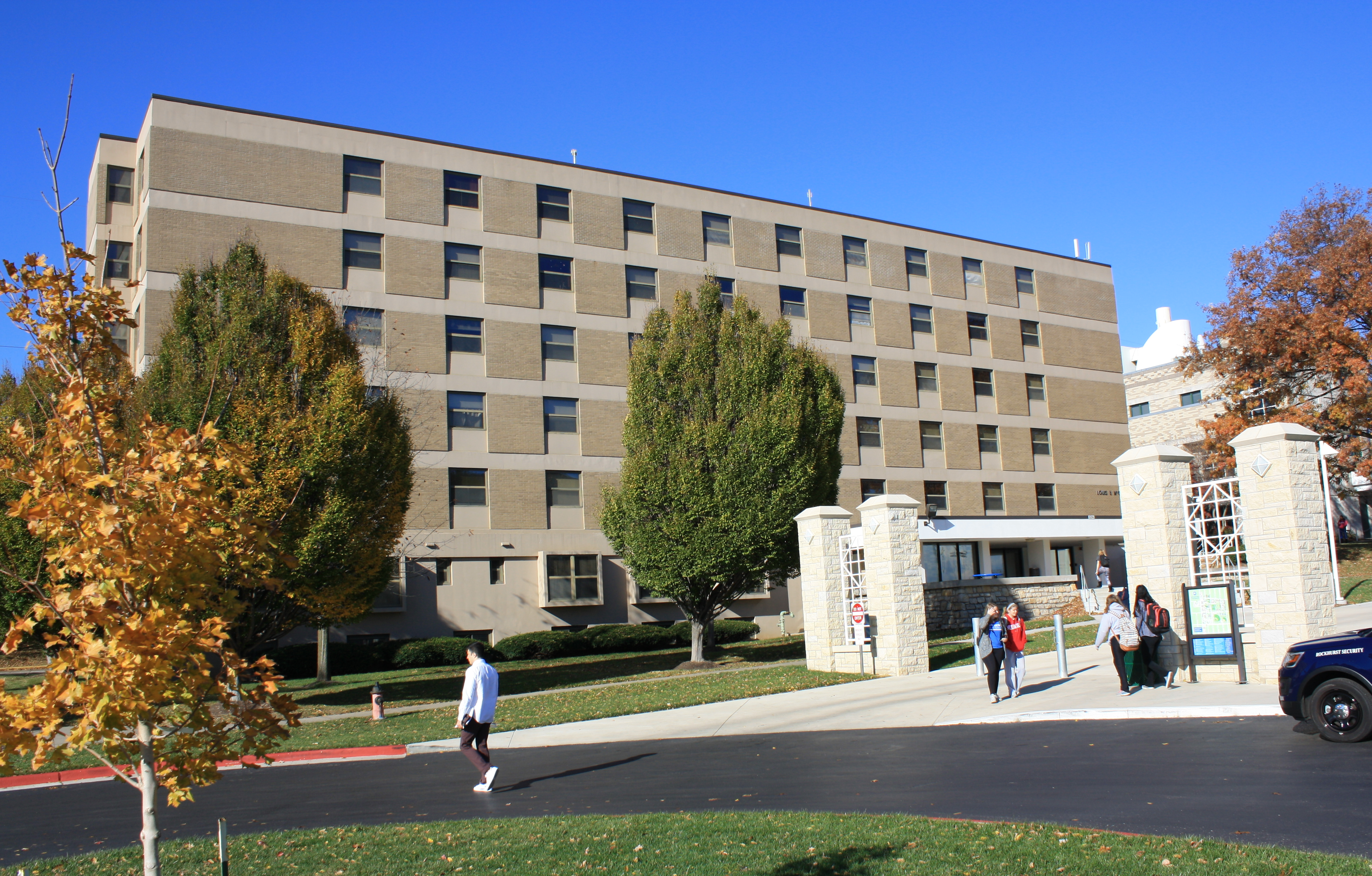
McGee Residence Hall for women

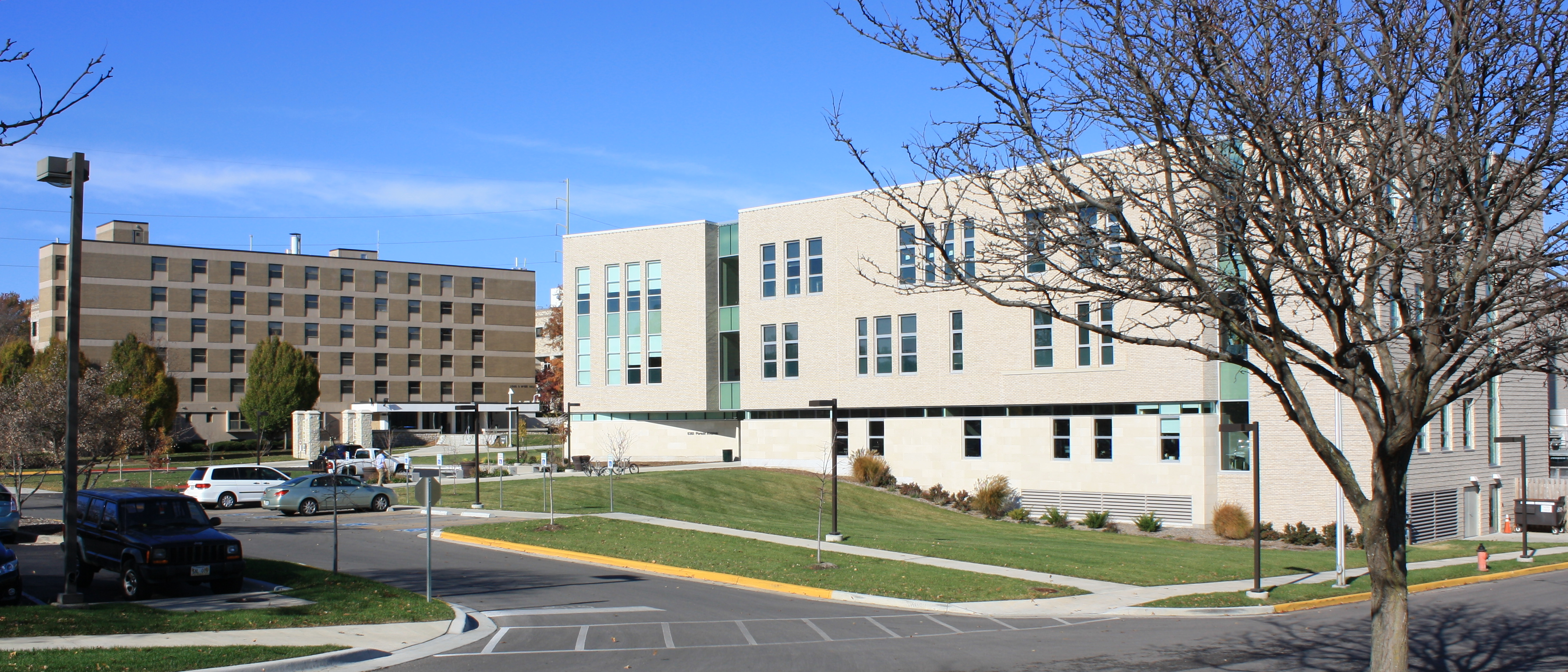
McGee & Arrupe Hall

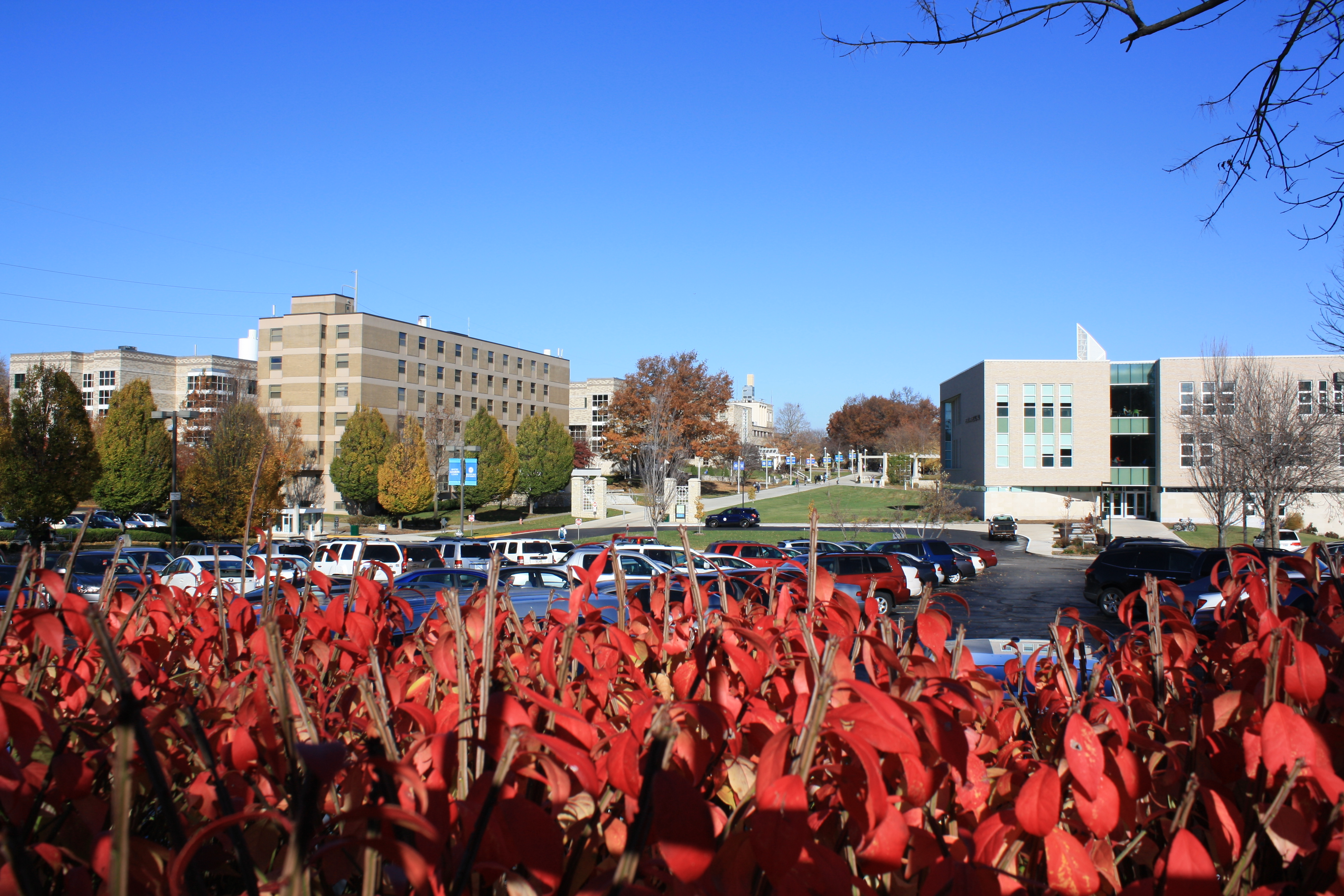
South end of campus

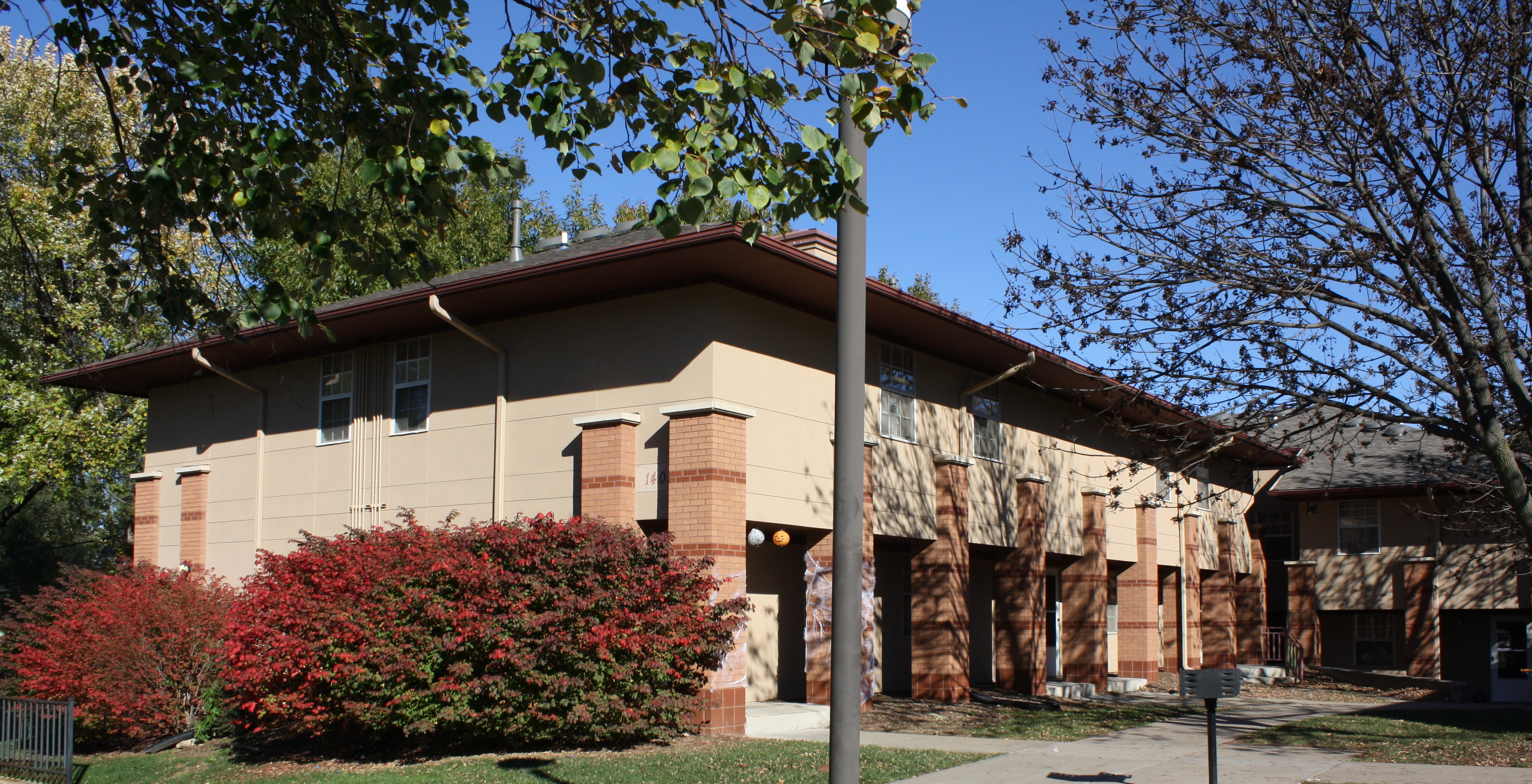
Townhouse, one of six

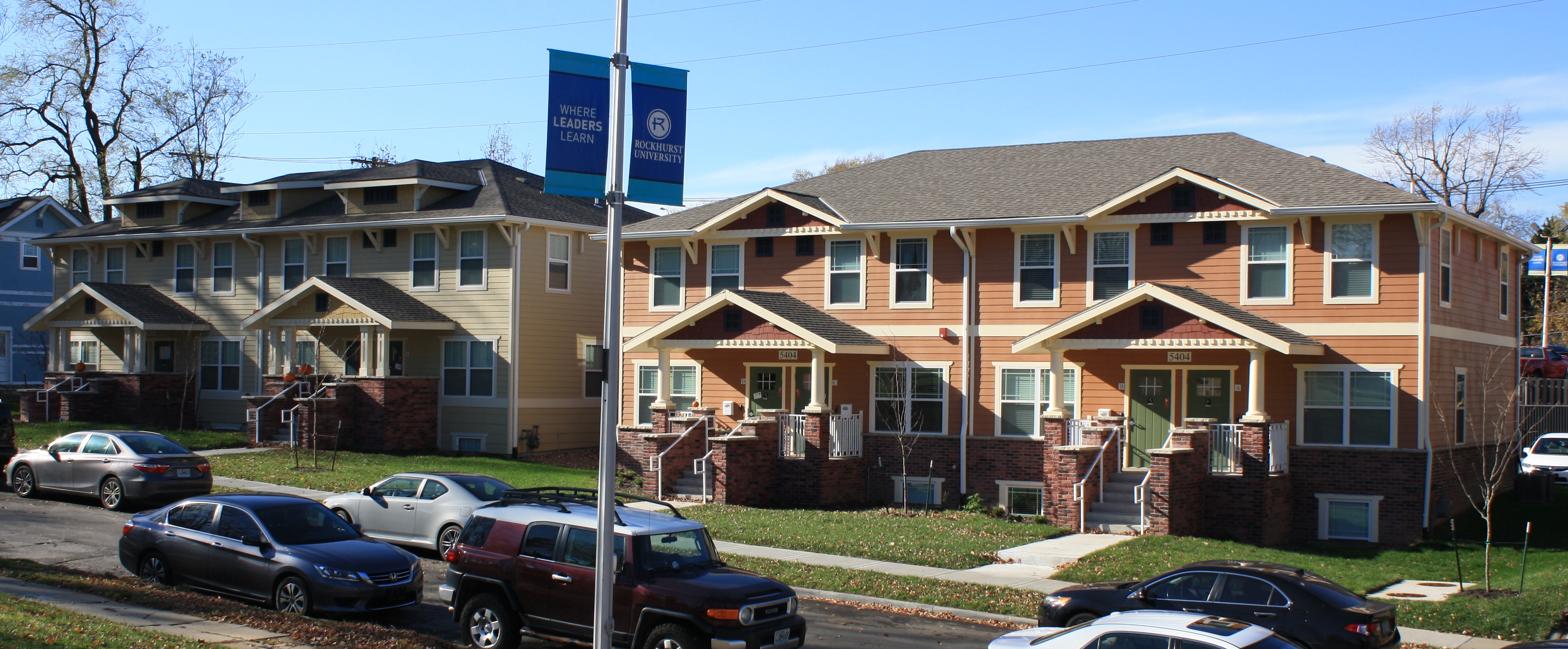
Off-campus housing

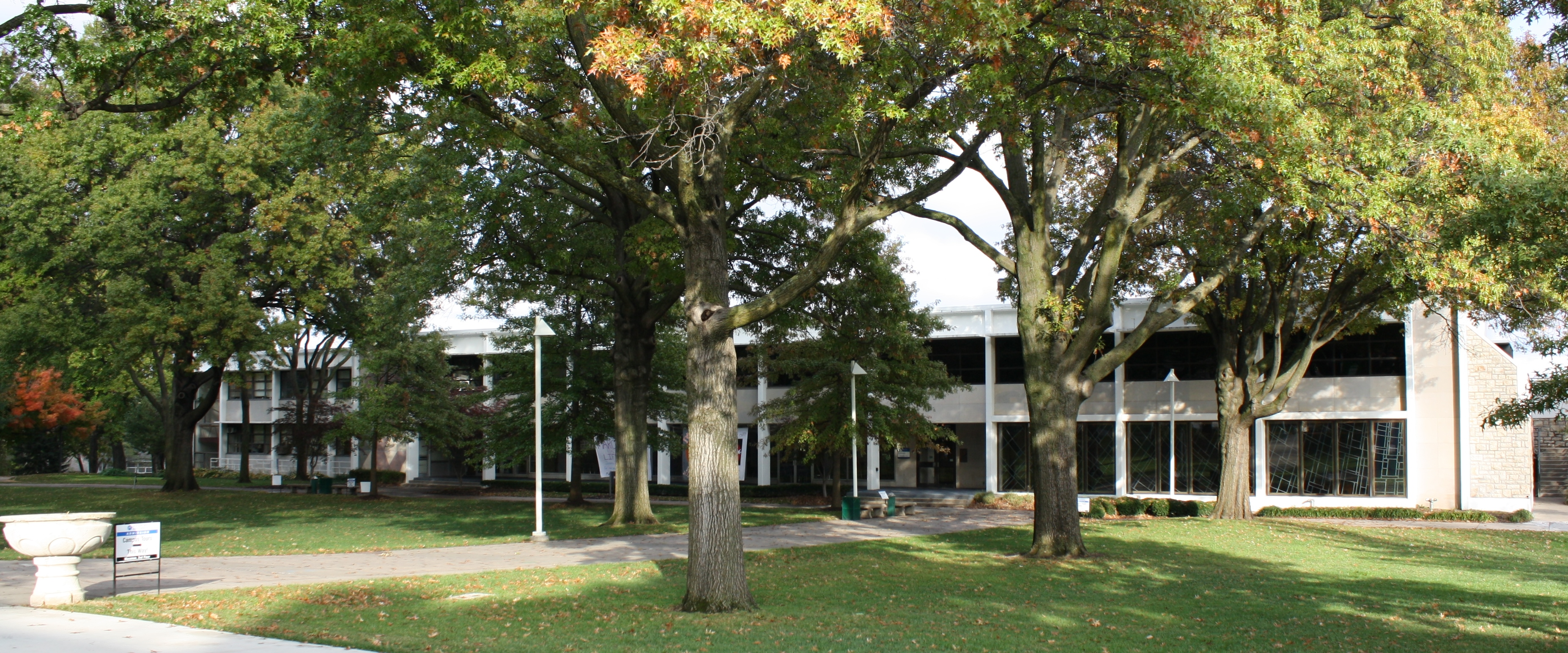
Massman Hall: chapel, dining, admissions

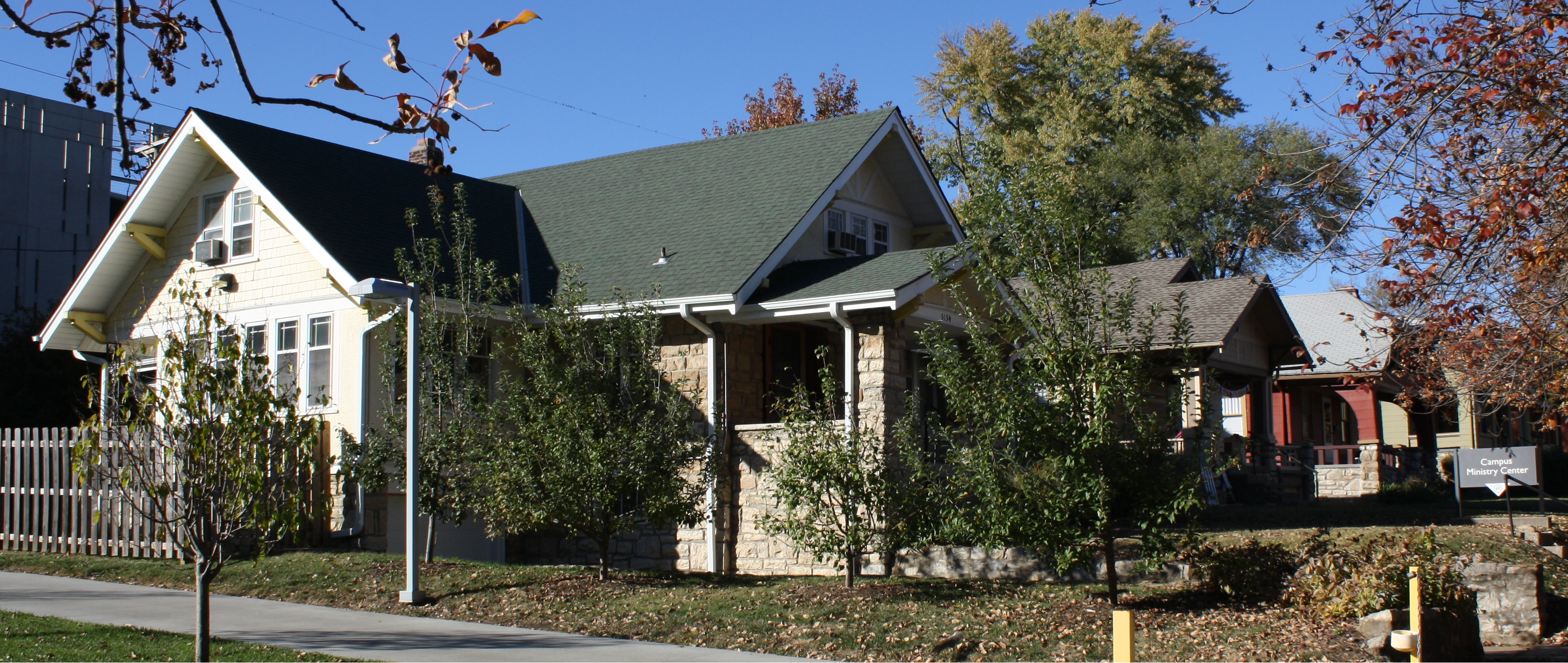
Campus Ministry house

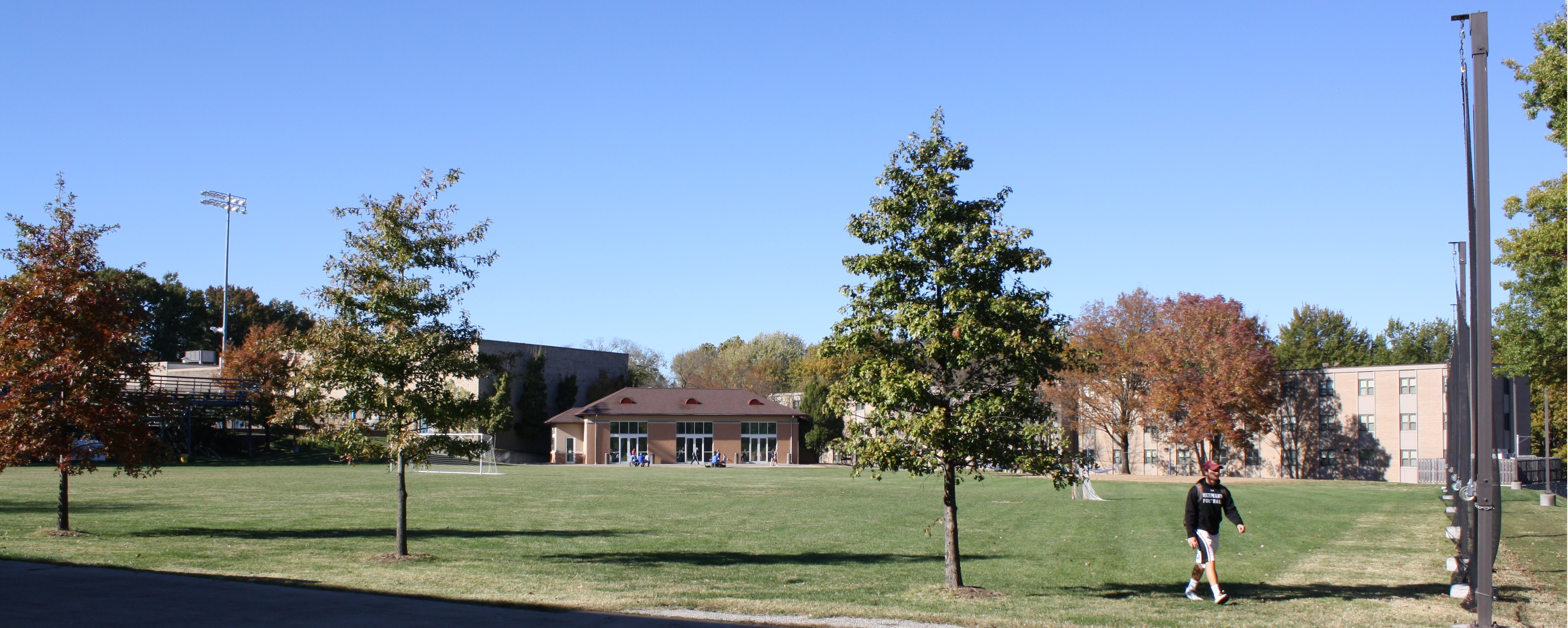
Student Activities Hall, field, Corcoran Residence

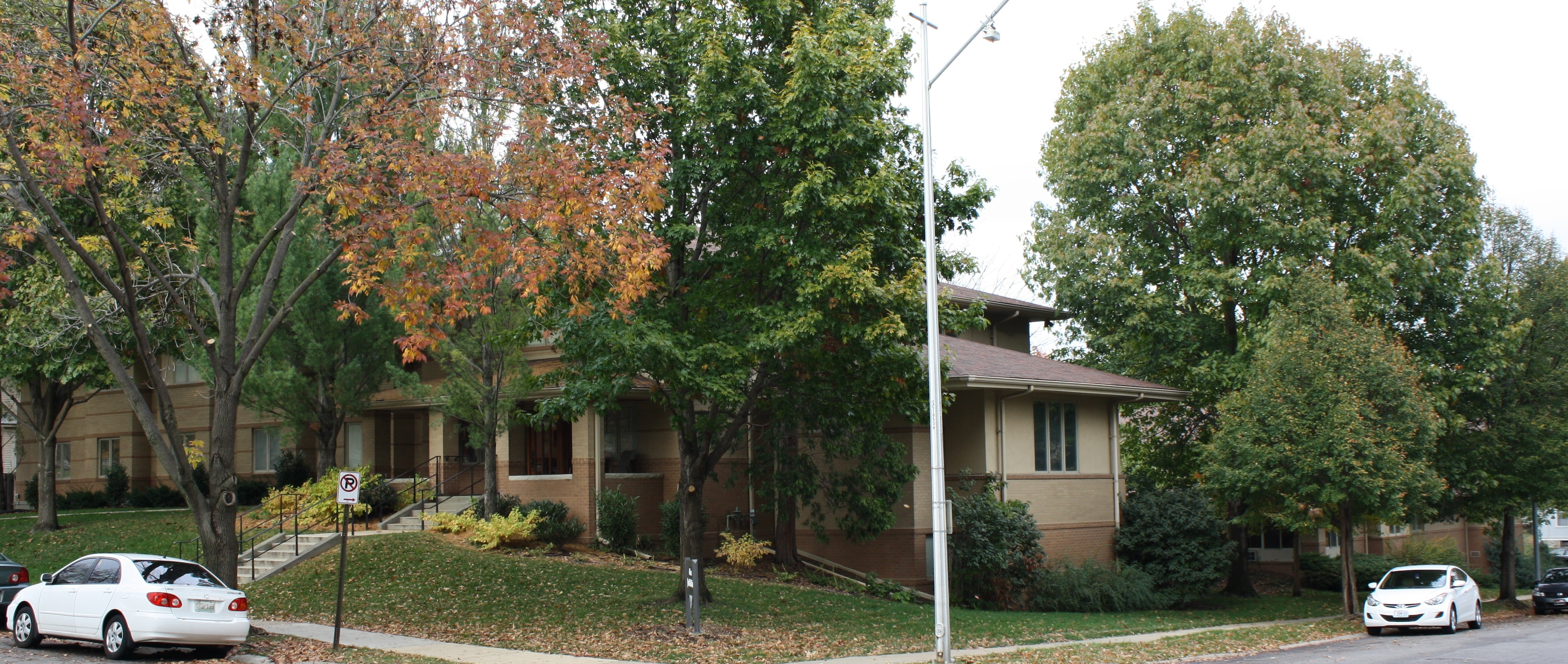
Jesuit residence at Rockhurst U.

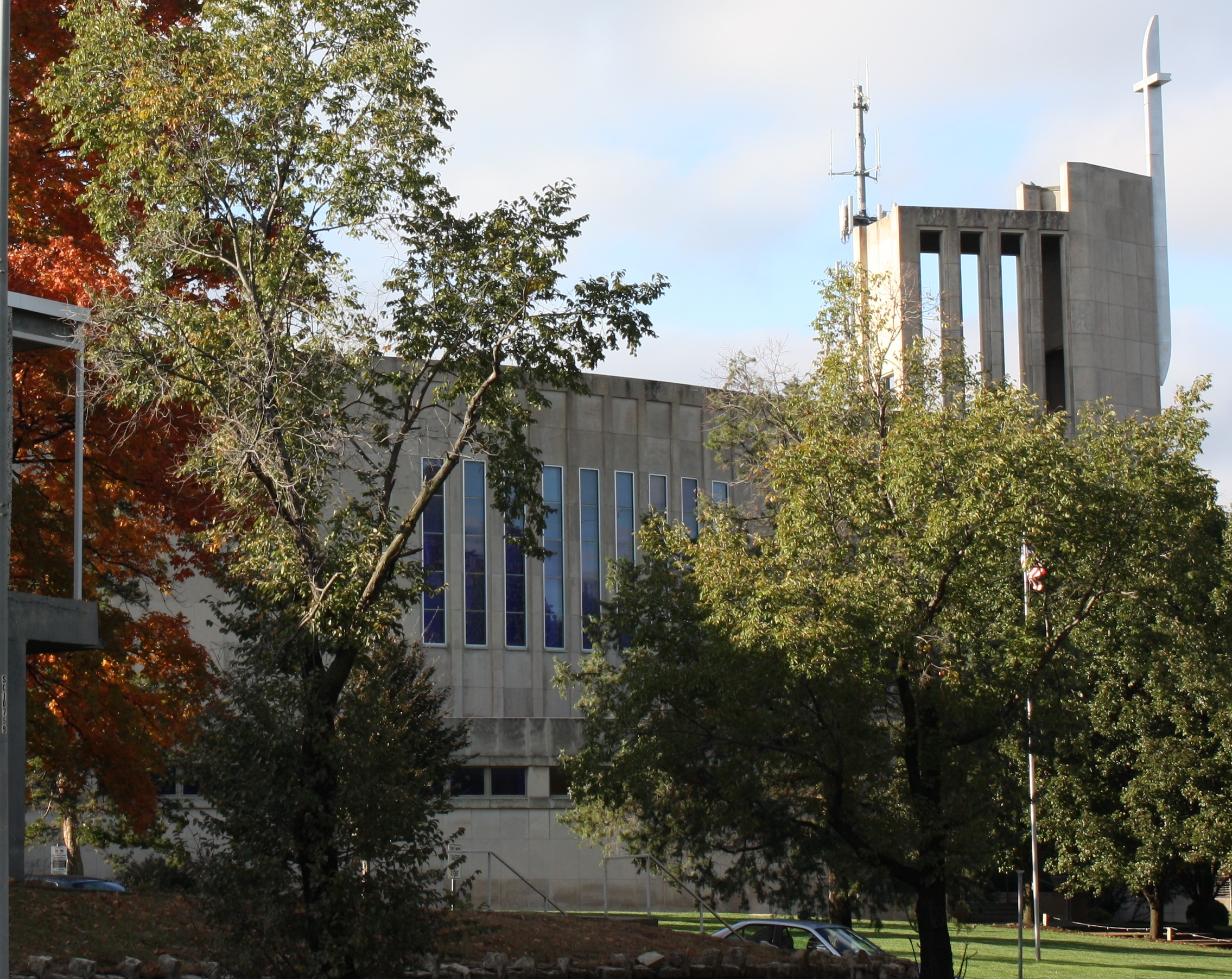
Xavier church at Rockhurst U.

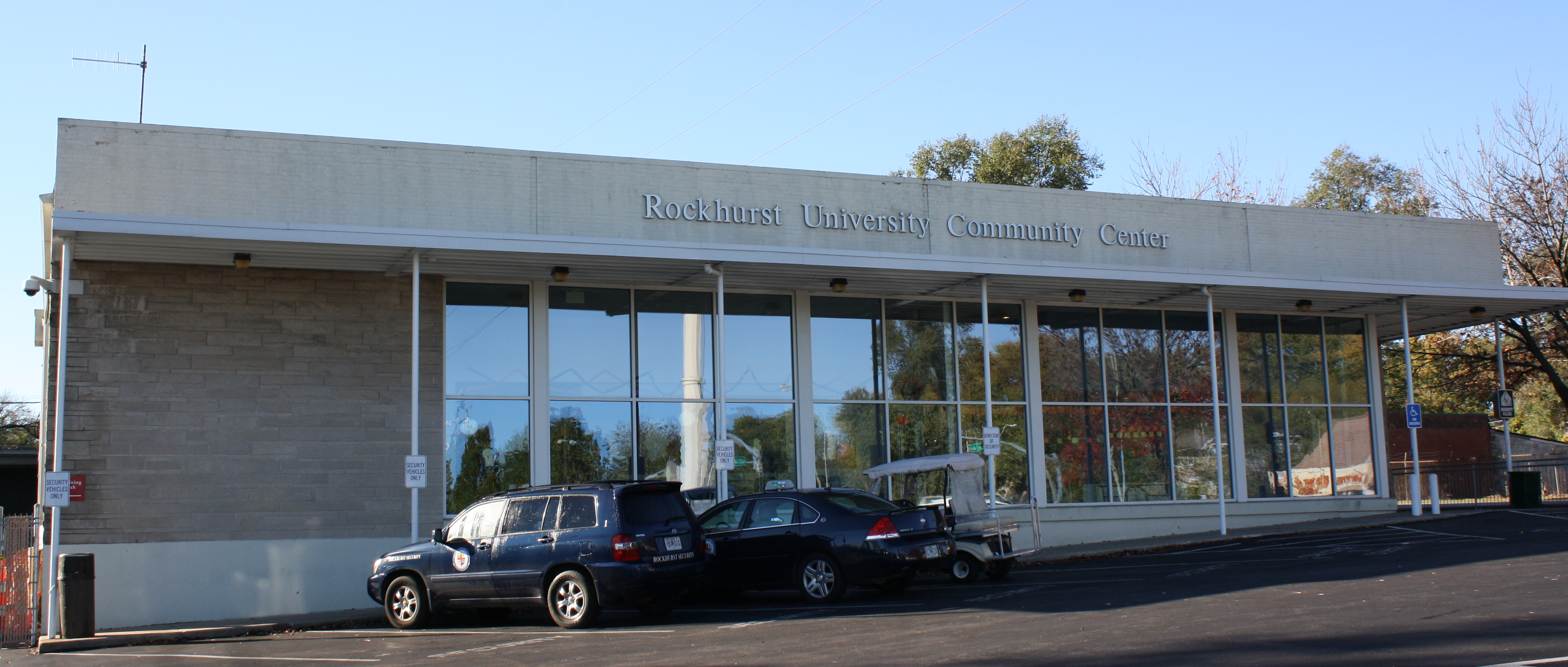
Rockhurst U. Community Center

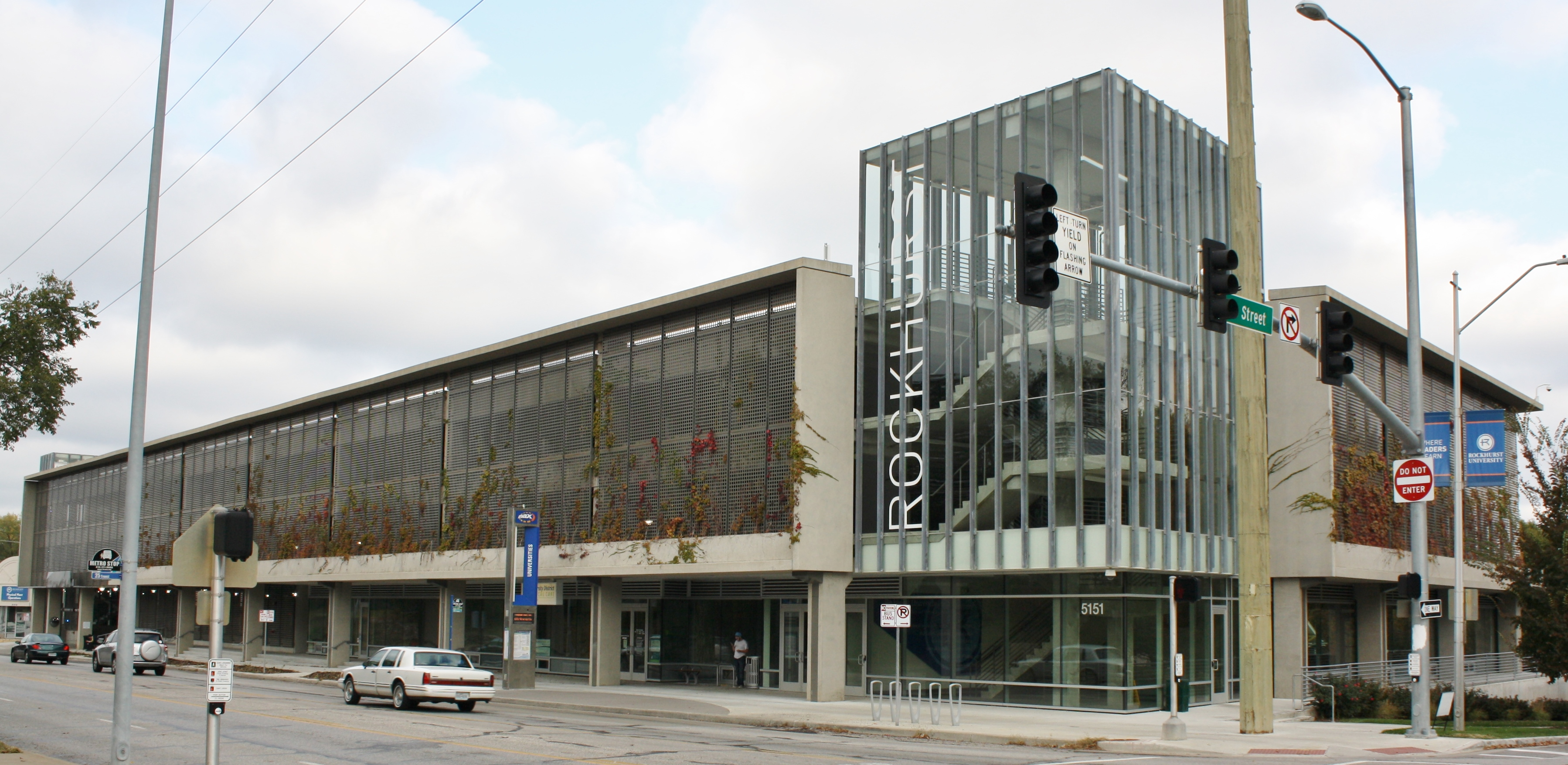
Rockhurst U. parking garage

== See also ==
- List of Jesuit sites
- History of education in Missouri
