= Michael Scanlan (priest) =

American Catholic priest (1931-2017)

The Reverend Michael Scanlan TOR
- Born: December 1, 1931; Long Island, New York, U.S.
- Died: January 7, 2017 (aged 85)
- Occupations: Catholic Priest; Academic administrator

Vincent Michael Scanlan, T.O.R. (December 1, 1931 – January 7, 2017) was an American Catholic priest of the Franciscan Third Order Regular. He was responsible for the revival of the College of Steubenville, now known as Franciscan University of Steubenville. Scanlan served as president of the university for 26 years and then 11 years as chancellor before retiring in 2011. He died in 2017 and was later accused of covering up sexual misconduct, and of sexually abusing a child.

== Biography ==
=== Early life and college ===
Scanlan was born on December 1, 1931, in Cedarhurst, New York, to Margaret O'Keefe Scanlan and Vincent Scanlan. When he was three, his parents separated. His father moved to Mexico, while his mother remarried and moved to New York City. Scanlan remained with his mother in New York, growing up in a predominantly lower-class Irish families; because of this, he grew to despise the rich. Although his mother had left the Roman Catholic Church after her separation, she brought him up in the faith, but Scanlan's stepfather hated the Church and took every opportunity to denounce it, according to Scanlon's autobiography.

He attended Coindre Hall Boarding School on Long Island, run by the Brothers of the Sacred Heart. He then went to New Hampton School, a college preparatory school in New Hampshire. After graduating from prep school, Scanlan entered Williams College in Massachusetts, and was accepted into Harvard Law School.

=== Military service ===
After graduation he did military service in the Air Force, as a lawyer in the Judge Advocate Corps of the Air Force.

=== Priesthood ===
Scanlan followed his old calling toward the priesthood, and after examining different options entered the Franciscans Third Order Regular (T.O.R.). He began his seminary formation at the St. Francis Seminary in Loretto, Pennsylvania, in September 1957. Scanlan was ordained in May 1964, taking the name Fr. Theophane Scanlan, T.O.R., offering his first Mass at St. Joseph's Church in Garden City, New York.

In August 1964, Scanlan became academic dean at the College of Steubenville in Steubenville, Ohio.

=== Return to the seminary, back to Steubenville ===
After five years at the college, Scanlan accepted the position of rector at St. Francis Seminary, where he had begun his seminary formation. At the seminary, Scanlan began a charismatic renewal based on prayer and community. However St. Francis Seminary was closed in 1978 due to a lack of interest in the Franciscan order.

In 1974, Scanlan left the St. Francis Seminary and returned to the College of Steubenville, as president. The school had declined greatly in enrollment and revenue, and Scanlan aimed to institute a charismatic renewal similar to the one at St. Francis Seminary. Scanlan took over the Sunday liturgy on the campus, and instituted households, small groups of men and women devoted to personal and communal growth, and required students to join one. Scanlan also created a renewal center on the campus, which organized retreats and seminars to further instruct students in the Roman Catholic faith. The center began holding religious conferences in the summers, which attracted many young people to the college. Scanlan often spoke at these conferences. Despite these changes, the college struggled to stay open. The first year after Scanlan instituted the changes, the incoming freshman class was the smallest that the college had ever seen. Five of the top administrators at the college left or were dismissed. Still, he continued to make changes, especially to the curriculum, introducing a theology program and developing graduate programs in business and theology, which helped the college win the title of university in 1980.

=== Charismatic Renewal affiliations ===
Scanlan was a prolific figure in the charismatic covenant community movement, acting in leadership roles in the Sword of the Spirit and Word of God (community). Scanlan led the covenant community group Servants of Christ the King, until he was requested to step down in 1991 at the behest of Bishop Albert Ottenweller, following concerns that the group had been influenced by elements in the Word of God (community) and Sword of the Spirit organizations, where leadership was said to be "excessively controlling members lives, including their marital relations and finances".

=== Retirement and death ===
After 26 years as president of the university, Scanlan stepped down in 2000, but was the school's chancellor until his retirement in 2011. Scanlan returned to Loretto and lived at the Sacred Heart Province motherhouse until his death. Scanlan died on January 7, 2017, after a long illness.

== Sex abuse scandals ==
A revelation came in late 2018 that a former chaplain at Franciscan of Steubenville, Fr Sam Tiesi, had engaged in years-long abuse of women at the university. Multiple victims said they made Scanlan aware but he did nothing or, in at least one case, verbally assaulted the accuser. It is further alleged that he participated in covering up and silencing those who accused Tiesi, his close friend.

In 2020 a civil case was brought in New Jersey alleging repeated sexual abuse of a 9-year-old boy by Scanlan. The case is ongoing. In 2022, Scanlan was named in a lawsuit alleging that he participated in would-be exorcisms of a sexual abuse victim of former Steubenville campus minister Fr David Morrier. The suit also claims that when told of the abuse by Morrier, Scanlan merely told the victim to practice chastity.

== Legacy ==
- The Franciscan University of Steubenville hosts an annual full tuition scholarship competition, called the Fr. Michael Scanlan Scholarship Competition.
- In 2012 the university announced the creation of the Father Michael Scanlan, TOR, Chair of Biblical Theology and the New Evangelization.
