= Thomas Curran (university president) =

Thomas B. Curran, SJ is an American Jesuit priest who served as president of Rockhurst University in Kansas City Missouri from 2006 to 2022. He was formerly an associate vice president at Regis University, a Jesuit university in Denver, Colorado.

Curran was initially Rockhurst's first non-Jesuit president, having been a member of the Oblates of St. Francis de Sales. He later entered the Jesuits in 2011 and made final vows in 2015. He also served as the Catholic chaplain for the Kansas City Chiefs of the National Football League. He was succeeded at Rockhurst by Sandra Cassady in 2022.

== Education ==
He has earned the following degrees:

- B.A. in Politics from DeSales University
- M.A. in Theology from DeSales School of Theology
- M.A. in Liberal Studies, Public Policy & Government from Georgetown University
- J.D. from The Catholic University of America
- M.B.A. from Saint Joseph's University
