= Sword of the Spirit =

Association of Christian communities

The Sword of the Spirit
- Formation: 1982
- Founders: Ralph Martin and Steve Clark
- Headquarters: Ann Arbor, Michigan, U.S.
- Members: 10,000, as of 2008
- Website: www.swordofthespirit.net

The Sword of the Spirit is an international, ecumenical association of Christian communities within the charismatic movement. As of 2017, the Sword of the Spirit is composed of 82 communities, 45 of which are Catholic. The member communities are composed predominantly of laypersons. The Sword of the Spirit is one of the largest federated networks of communities to come out of the Catholic charismatic renewal. (Note: Other associations of communities to emerge include the People of Praise, the Emmanuel Community, the Mother of God Community network, the European Network of Communities, and the Catholic Fraternity of Charismatic Covenant Communities and Fellowships. Rush, Theophane (1994). "Covenant Communities in the United States". Pneuma. 16 (1): 233–245. doi:10.1163/157007494X00210.)

== History ==
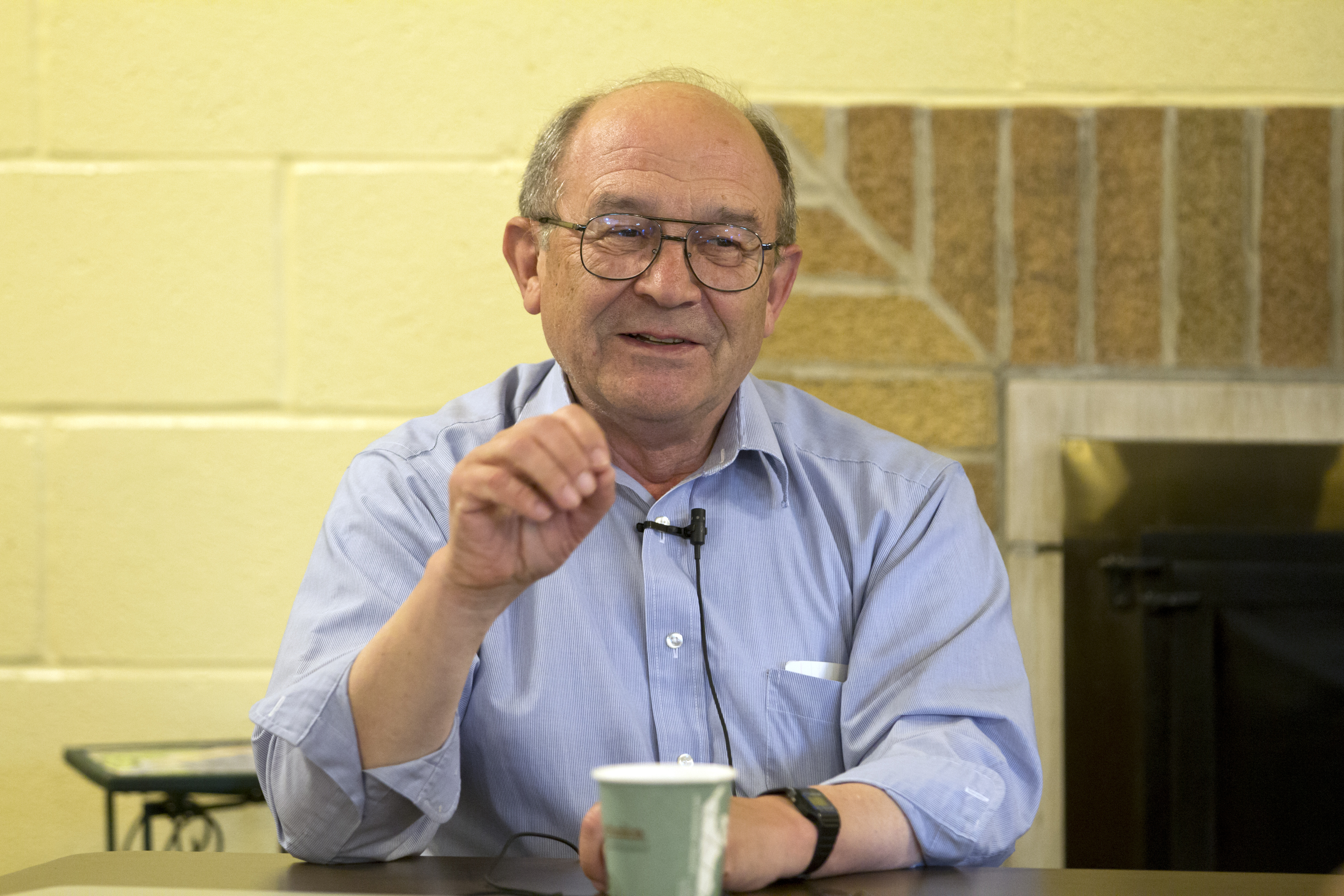
Steve Clark

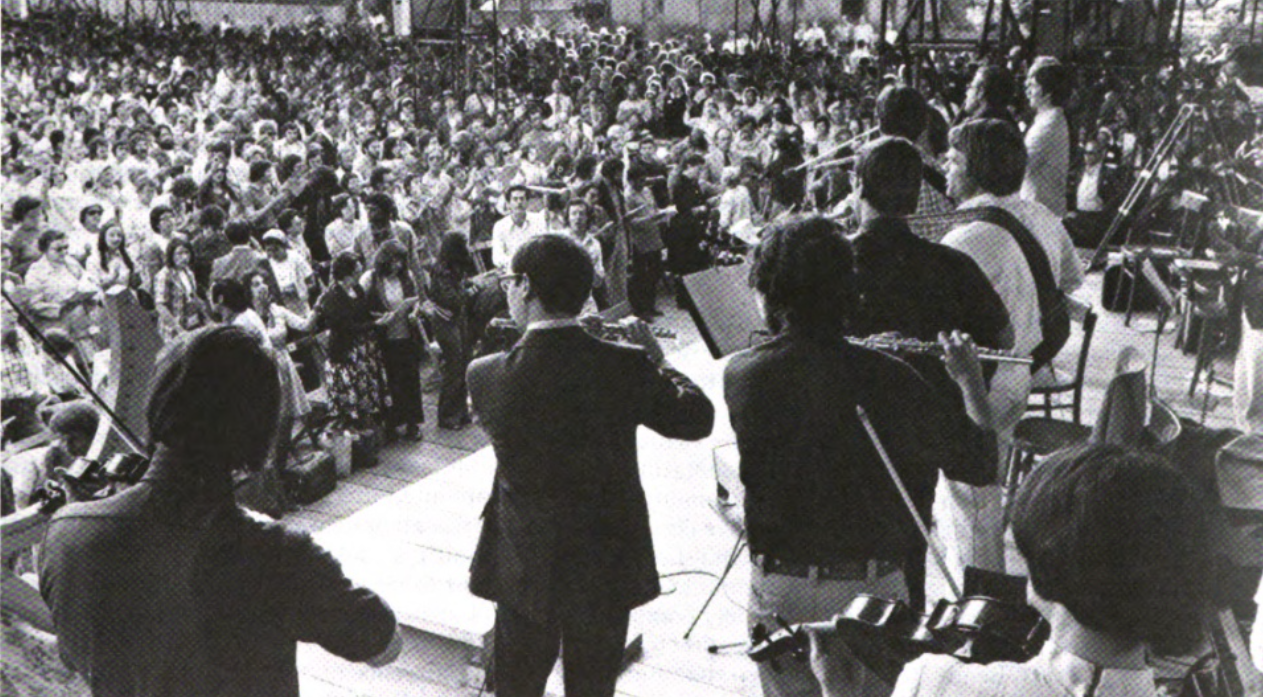
Word of God Music Group at Rome Conference in 1975

=== Background ===
In the 1960s, two Americans, Ralph C. Martin and Stephen B. Clark, founded The Word of God. Clark was born in 1940, and studied at Yale University, the University of Freiburg, and the University of Notre Dame. Martin was a friend of Clark's, and the two of them had been deeply impacted by the Cursillo movement. After some success bringing the Cursillo movement to a network of college groups, Clark and Martin experienced the charismatic renewal, which they began to write and teach about.

Cardinal Leo Joseph Suenens was a supporter of Clark, Martin, and other early leaders of the Catholic charismatic renewal. In 1972, Suenens visited the Word of God community, endorsed it, and encouraged its international expansion. In response, within the same year Clark and Yocum founded the Servants of the Word, an ecumenical celibate brotherhood of men who committed to lifelong service of Sword of the Spirit communities around the world. Russ Bellant reports 100 members of the Servants of the Word, including Clark, in 1988, and describes the brotherhood as a "quasi-religious order". Throughout the 1970s, Martin, Clark, and other leaders traveled internationally, sharing about the charismatic renewal, and planting the seeds for intentional communities.

Between 1980 and 1981, Clark instituted a training course that relied heavily on the teachings of his 1980 book, Man and Woman in Christ. Thomas J. Csordas, an anthropology professor, states, "Clark's course made minutely explicit prescriptions for proper comportment, gender-appropriate dress, child-rearing practices, and the domestic division of labor. In addition, it identified global trends presumed to threaten the community mission of building the Kingdom of God—Islam, communism, feminism, and gay rights." The training course was guided by a philosophy that imposed high demands on community members, and several members were effectively shunned for a failure to adhere to its principles, creating tensions within the community that would reverberate for more than a decade.

=== Founding ===
In 1982, the communities that had chosen to align with Word of God were federated into a unified, international association. Member communities submitted to governance of a council headed by Clark. Other prominent early members were the communities in Gaithersburg, Maryland and South Bend, Indiana. While the Sword of the Spirit consisted primarily of Catholics, its membership was open to other Christians. By 1988, Sword of the Spirit included 45 branches and associated communities, 22 of which were in the United States. By 1989, Sword of the Spirit newsletters reported 10 branch communities, 24 affiliate groups, and 13 associated communities.

Russ Bellant reports that Fr John Bertolucci (a leader of the Catholic branch of Sword of the Spirit) and Ralph Martin each received support from Tom Monaghan for their respective TV ministries during the 80's. Monaghan is also reported to have supported Sword of the Spirit programmes in South America. Fr Patrick Egan, who was the Domino's corporate chaplain is also reported as involved with the Sword of the Spirit via the Word of God Community, and the Christ the King parish.

=== Split with Word of God ===
In 1991, a schism occurred. Martin effectively renounced the rigid vision that guided the training course, while Clark, though conceding the course had been awkwardly implemented, believed that its principles were sound and worthy of continued adherence. Several communities, including the Word of God (led by Martin), adopted a new "allied" status—maintaining ties to the fellowship while also reclaiming autonomy that had been surrendered to the fellowship's leadership council. Servants of the Word, led by Clark, announced that it was an autonomous community not bound by the Word of God's decision, choosing instead to remain firmly within Sword of the Spirit.

Meanwhile, throughout the 1990s, a number of Sword of the Spirit member communities were censured by Catholic bishops for excessively authoritarian practices. In 1990, for example, Bishop Albert Henry Ottenweller required the community in his diocese to separate from the Sword of the Spirit. Similarly, the People of Hope, a Sword of the Spirit community in the Roman Catholic Archdiocese of Newark, was strongly criticized by Archbishop Peter Leo Gerety and his successor Theodore McCarrick. Accusations had been made against the People of Hope involving "abuse, mind control, elitist behavior and cult-like controls." These concerns were addressed by 2007, when the People of Hope received official recognition from Archbishop John J. Myers.

Civil lawsuits were entered against the Sword of the Spirit and Servants of the Word leadership following the conviction of Jamie Treadwell for sexual abuse of children, and further allegations of sexual abuse of children against Ed Conlin, both who were members of Servants of the Word at the reported times. Sword of the Spirit and Servants of the Word leadership admitted to knowing of previous allegation concerning these individuals dating back decades.

=== Membership ===
As of 2008, the Sword of the Spirit had 65 branches across 24 countries and approximately 10,000 total members. In 2023, the Sword of the Spirit reported having 14,000 members.

== Description ==
The Sword of the Spirit describes itself as "a community of disciples on mission."

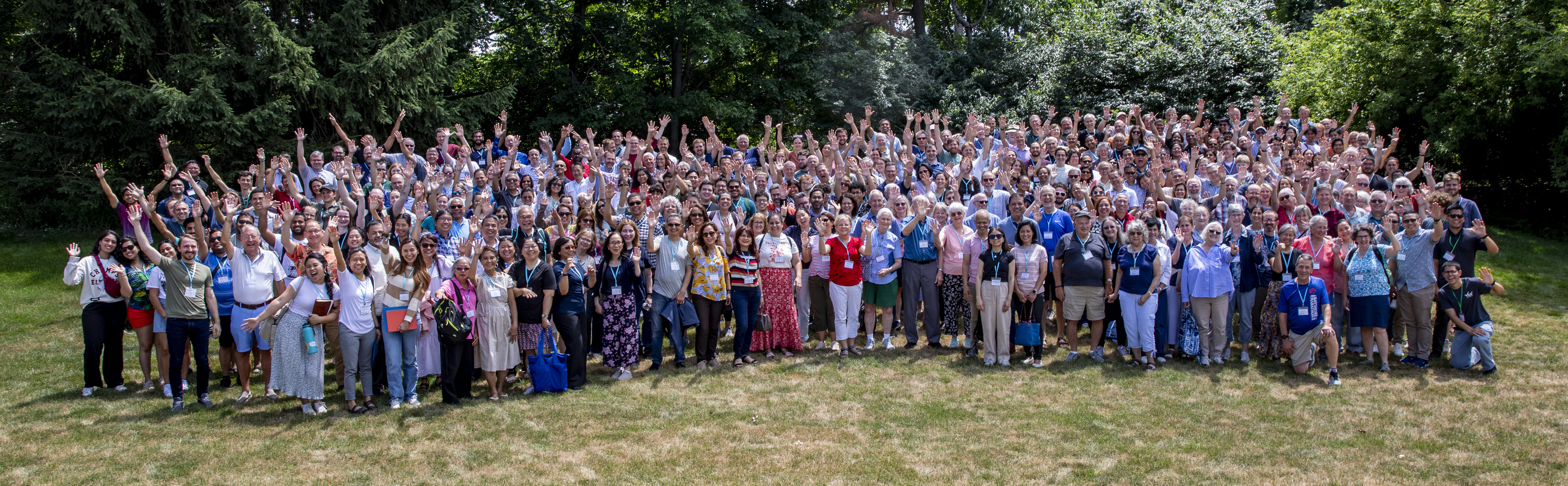
Sword of the Spirit North American Regional Conference 2025

=== Community life ===
The Sword of the Spirit is an association of 'covenant communities'. In The New International Dictionary of Pentecostal and Charismatic Movements Thigpen describes the 'covenant' aspect of communities formed by Clark and Martin as involving "a commitment to at least some degree of sharing financial resources, regular participation in community gatherings, and submission to the direction of the group's designated authorities".

After a period of formation and discernment, members have the opportunity to make a "public commitment", a commitment which "is open-ended in that members agree to remain part of the community unless the Lord clearly leads them elsewhere." Occasionally, members "transfer their commitment from one SOS community to another, particularly when younger members marry between communities or are seeking to get established in a career and can do so better in another location." Some member communities are Catholic associations of the Christian faithful.

=== Gender roles ===
Gender roles within Sword of the Spirit communities have followed a traditional model of gender roles with patriarchal values, where males maintain headship over females within the communities.

=== Leadership and organization ===
The individual members of Sword of the Spirit live in family households or households of single men or women. Each member is assigned a pastoral leader of the same gender. According to Csordas, these pastoral leaders are similar to lay spiritual advisors, to which fully committed members are obedient on issues of morality, spirituality, and community order. Members say that the possibility of coercion is mitigated by the fact that, generally speaking, the pastoral leaders give advice rather than orders, and that members usually have a close relationship with their pastoral leader. Csordas speculates that this pastoral system is adapted from the Shepherding movement.

According to Csordas, "community governance is organised at local, regional, and international levels. Leaders meet periodically at each of these levels, sometimes with separate meetings for male and female leaders. As one Sword of the Spirit Coordinator says, 'We try to do as much as possible at the local and regional levels'." The communities are self-governing, but they share in the same support structure.

=== Religious practices ===
Religious practice within the Sword of the Spirit include a range of practices from Pentecostalism. These practices have historically included exorcism and demonology, as well as practices seen elsewhere in charismatic Christianity, such as speaking in tongues, spiritual gifts (or 'charisms'), faith healing and prophecy.

== Outreach ==
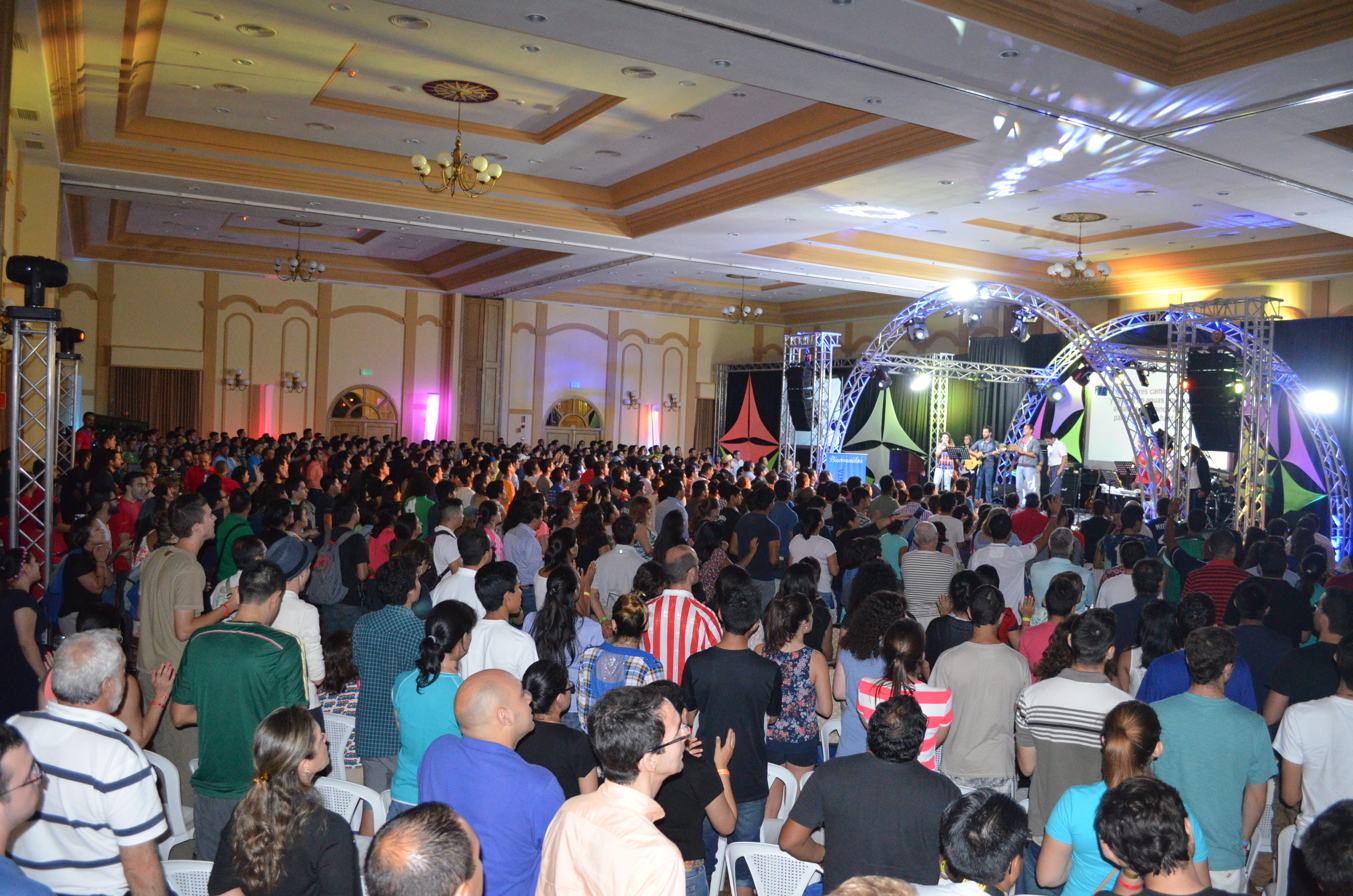
2015 Kairos Conference in Costa Rica

In 2009, the Sword of the Spirit instituted a fellowship of celibate women called the Bethany Association.

Kairos describe themselves as "the regional youth program of The Sword of the Spirit" with the objective of "serving Sword of the Spirit teens and their friends."

University Christian Outreach also describe themselves as an outreach of the Sword of the Spirit. This organisation aims to achieve strategic outreach and community building at university campuses.

The Brotherhood of Hope is a member community of the Sword of the Spirit dedicated to college campus ministry.

NET Ministries were founded at the Community of Christ the Redeemer (which is a member community of the Sword of the Spirit). The NET president in 2017, Mark Berchem, was a coordinator at the Community of Christ the Redeemer.

'Brothers' from Servants of the Word are active in various youth outreaches such as Kairos, University Christian Outreach and Youth Initiatives.

== Reception ==
Margaret Atwood has said that her 1985 book, The Handmaid's Tale, was partially inspired by "a Catholic charismatic spinoff sect, which calls the women handmaids." In other interviews, pointing to an Associated Press clipping from her archives, she identified that sect as People of Hope. However, subsequent investigations revealed that the newspaper clipping Atwood shared in an interview was published after the publication of her book, calling into doubt whether the article actually served as inspiration for Atwood.

In 1997, theologian Adrian Reimers, a former member of the People of Praise, wrote a scathing critique of the People of Praise, Sword of the Spirit, and similar groups, alleging "the abuse of authority" among the organizations' leadership. Reimers claimed that such renewal groups, while containing many "positive signs," diminish individual autonomy and believe that the Catholic Church is "unable to support an authentic Christian life" apart from renewal communities.

Cardinal Raniero Cantalamessa, who formerly described himself as "a strong adversary" of the charismatic movement, claims to have experienced baptism in the Holy Spirit through a ministry which would later become the People of Hope, which is now a Sword of the Spirit community.

In a 2010 synodal proceeding, George Bacouni, an archbishop of the Melkite Greek Catholic Church, commended the catechetical approach of the Sword of the Spirit as a model for the Eastern Catholic Churches. According to Bacouni, the Sword of the Spirit "is not solely aimed at education of the mind but rather at bringing the faithful to a personal relationship with Jesus, a discovery of their call and mission, and to a deeper communion with the Church."

== Notable members ==
- Anton Colella
- Michael Scanlan (priest) (member of Servants of Christ the King)
- Rogelio Singson (member of Ang Ligaya ng Panginoon)
- Aniceto Sobrepeña (member of Ang Ligaya ng Panginoon)

== See also ==
- Emmanuel Community
- People of Praise
