= Duquesne Weekend =

1967 weekend retreat

- Date: February 17–19, 1967
- Venue: The Ark and the Dove
- Location: Gibsonia, Pennsylvania, United States
- Organized by: Ralph W. Keifer, William G. Storey
- Participants: 25–30
- Outcome: Catholic charismatic renewal

The Duquesne Weekend was a retreat for Duquesne University students which initiated the charismatic renewal in the Catholic Church. The retreat was held on February 17–19, 1967, at The Ark and the Dove retreat center in Gibsonia, Pennsylvania, United States.

== Background ==
In 1966, graduate student Ralph A. Keifer and history professor William G. Storey of Duquesne University began using the Pentecost sequence Veni Sancte Spiritus to pray for a new outpouring of the Holy Spirit. During this period they attended a Cursillo, and were given two books which describe the experience of baptism in the Holy Spirit: The Cross and the Switchblade and They Speak With Other Tongues.

In February 1967, Keifer and Storey were themselves baptized in the Holy Spirit at an Episcopalian charismatic prayer group. At the time, Keifer and Storey had already been organizing a student retreat, and, on account of their experience, they decided to center the retreat on the Holy Spirit.

== Account of the retreat ==
One of the retreatants, Patti Gallagher Mansfield, described the Saturday night of the retreat as follows:

Saturday night a birthday party was planned for a few of our members, but there was a listlessness in the group. I wandered into the upstairs chapel… not to pray but to tell any students there to come down to the party. Yet, when I entered and knelt in the presence of Jesus in the Blessed Sacrament, I literally trembled with a sense of awe before His majesty. I knew in an overwhelming way that He is the King of Kings, the Lord of Lords… I ran down to tell our chaplain what had happened and he said that David Mangan had been in the chapel before me and had encountered God’s presence in the same way. Two girls told me my face was glowing and wanted to know what had happened… Within the next hour God sovereignly drew many of the students into the chapel. Some were laughing, others crying. Some prayed in tongues, others (like me) felt a burning sensation coursing through their hands. One of the professors walked in and exclaimed, “What is the Bishop going to say when he hears that all these kids have been baptized in the Holy Spirit!” Yes, there was a birthday party that night, God had planned it in the Upper Room Chapel.

Many of the students, including Mangan, reported speaking in tongues that night in the chapel.

== Aftermath ==
Keifer sent the news of the retreat to the Catholics at the University of Notre Dame, where a similar event soon after occurred, and the baptism in the Holy Spirit began to spread. For example, by March 1967, Ralph C. Martin, a leader in the Cursillo movement, had become among the earliest beneficiaries of the Duquesne Weekend, and went on to become a major leader in the Catholic charismatic renewal.
