= Brotherhood of Hope =

- Abbreviation: B.H.
- Formation: 1980
- Type: Association of the faithful in the Catholic Church
- Headquarters: Boston, Massachusetts
- Website: brotherhoodofhope.org

The Brotherhood of Hope (abbreviated B.H.) is an association of the faithful in the Catholic Church, composed primarily of religious brothers who serve in college campus ministry. They are also a member of an association of charismatic communities called the Sword of the Spirit.

== Early history ==
The association was founded in 1980 in Newark, New Jersey by Father Philip Merdinger, a Catholic priest from the Roman Catholic Archdiocese of Newark, and five lay men who came together to consecrate themselves to God through private vows.

This new community had been formed by an association of charismatic Catholic families in New Jersey known as the People of Hope and from the inspiration of an ecumenical group of consecrated men in Michigan called the Servants of the Word.

Their first apostolate was in New Jersey, serving students at Rutgers University. In 1995 they were invited by Cardinal Bernard Law to establish their headquarters in the Roman Catholic Archdiocese of Boston, with canonical approval in 1998.

== Description ==
The Brotherhood of Hope serves Catholic campus ministries at University of Central Florida, Northeastern University, Rutgers University, University of South Florida and the University of Minnesota. They formerly served at Florida State University, Boston University and in other ministries.

In December 2012, Father Robert W. Oliver, a member of the Brotherhood of Hope, was appointed by Pope Benedict XVI to the Promoter of Justice for the Congregation for the Doctrine of the Faith. In September 2014, Oliver was promoted by Pope Francis to be the first secretary of the Pontifical Commission for the Protection of Minors.
