= Word of God (community) =

Christian community in Michigan, US

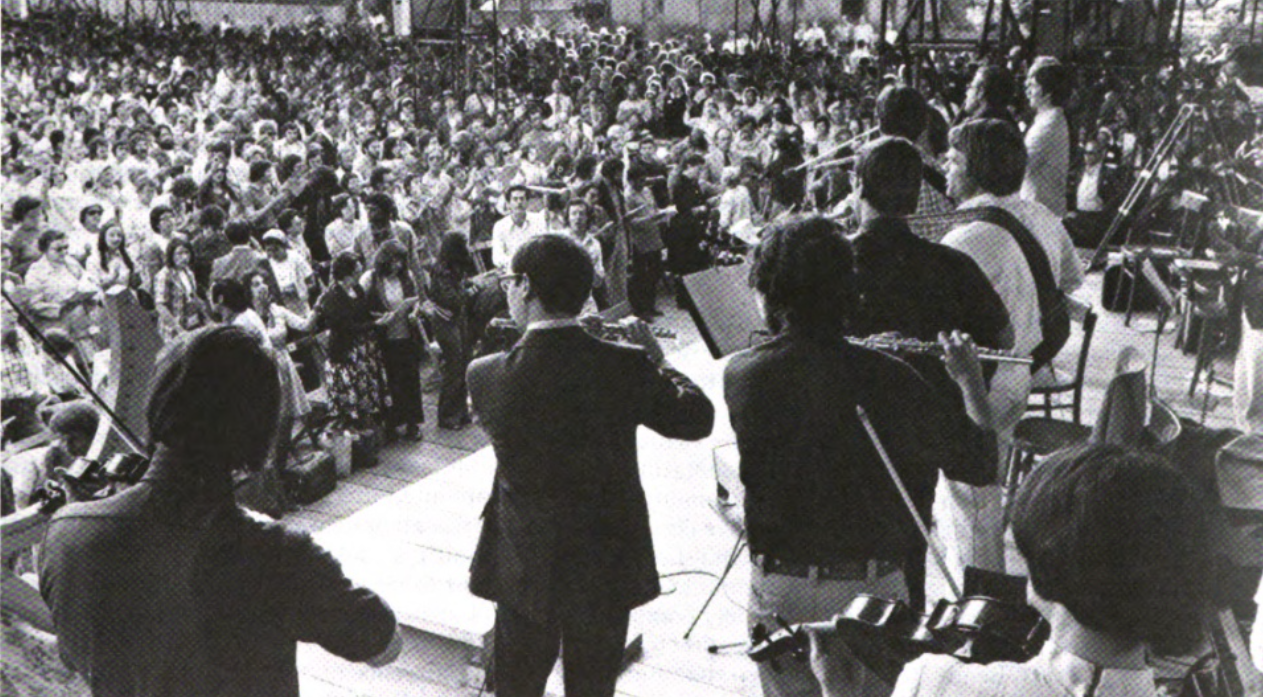
Word of God Music Group at Rome Conference in 1975

The Word of God is an ecumenical, charismatic, missionary Christian community in Ann Arbor, Michigan. The community began in 1967.

== Origins 1967–1976 ==
An influential figure within the covenant community movement was Stephen B. Clark. In the early days of the renewal, as influenced by the Cursillo movement, several Catholic covenant communities were formed. Along with The Word of God, a sibling major community from among them is the People of Praise and the True House communities, both formed in South Bend, Indiana, in 1971. Others are Sword of the Spirit, the Mother of God Community as well as constituent members of the North American Network of Charismatic Covenant Communities. Such communities may have been influenced by the communitarianism of the 1960s counterculture. Historical theologian Paul Thigpen writes that in general these communities "typically involved a commitment to at least some degree of sharing financial resources, regular participation in community gatherings, and submission to the direction of the group’s designated authorities." Larger communities were often divided into "households", which did not always mean members were living in the same house. However, members of the same household needed to live close enough to each other to share meals, prayer times and other forms of fellowship. Most households were made up of one or two families, but others might be for single men or women. The Word of God was founded in 1967 by four young Catholics. Ralph Martin and Stephen Clark were formerly involved in the Cursillo movement office in Lansing, Michigan, and Jim Cavnar and Gerry Rauch were involved in Charismatic renewal work at the University of Notre Dame and had come to carry out evangelism in Ann Arbor, Michigan, after their encounter with the Catholic Charismatic movement at Duquesne University that year.

The Word of God began publishing a magazine, New Covenant, which by 1972 claimed to have 12,000 subscribers in 87 countries.

== Community life ==
The members of the community, in many cases, lived in common together in houses. There were houses for married couples and houses for single men or women. They also had dorm households at the University of Michigan and Eastern Michigan University. The different households began to be split up into different "districts".

Members of the community attended Sunday morning services at their local Catholic or Protestant churches (apart from the Word of God community), and then met together for a weekly district prayer meeting, and a monthly citywide prayer meeting. Many families home-schooled their children and the community also had its own school. Adult members of the community each had a spiritual leader who was another member of the community. A married woman's spiritual leader was her husband. A single woman's spiritual leader was typically a married woman. A single man's spiritual leader was typically a married man.

== National and global expansion ==
An international association of charismatic communities called the Sword of the Spirit was created in 1983. Word of God operated as a Sword of the Spirit member community until 1990 when Word of God disaffiliated with Sword of the Spirit following the command of Bishop Ottenweller.

William Paul McCartney of the Promise Keepers is reported by Russ Bellant as being "deeply influenced" by the Word of God Community.

While an assistant coach for the Michigan Wolverines football, Bill McCartney became involved in the Word of God community, calling community leader Jim Berlucci the one of two men who most influenced him. McCartney went on to found a men's ministry called Promise Keepers.

== Fellowships ==
In 1979, the Word of God created four denominational subgroupings or "fellowships" to help people live out the aspects of their faith that they could not live in a strictly interdenominational setting. The four fellowships were the Catholic Fellowship of the Word of God (now Christ the King Catholic Church), Cross and Resurrection Lutheran, Covenant Presbyterian, and Emmaus Fellowship. The Emmaus Fellowship became the Vineyard Church of Milan, which later spawned the Vineyard Church of Ann Arbor. After Pastor Ken Wilson's controversial acceptance of gay marriage, the Vineyard Church of Milan shut down and the Vineyard Church of Ann Arbor removed Wilson from the pulpit. This resulted in Wilson forming a local Ann Arbor chapter of the Blue Ocean Faith Community.

== Servant Publications ==
A publishing house affiliated with the Community, Servant Publications, published works by contemporary Catholic and Evangelical authors, including community members Bert Ghezzi, Stephen Clark, and Ralph Martin. These books presented songs used in charismatic renewal prayer groups, many written by members of the Word of God Community. Servant Publications ceased operations in 2003.

== Cult question ==
In the 1980s, allegations that The Word of God was practicing too much control over its members, prompted leadership of both the Roman Catholic Church, and the Lutheran Church–Missouri Synod to send teams to investigate the community and determine if what they were teaching was orthodox. In 1989, a coalition of seven groups led a boycott of Domino's Pizza, due to the connection between Tom Monaghan and the Word of God. In the 1990s, students at MIT alleged that Domino's then-CEO was using company funds to finance the church. More recent publishing in the New York Times recounts the group as "dogmatic".

Russ Bellant describes the Word of God as "a select and insular group" which "practiced shepherding/discipleship" (see the Shepherding Movement). Bellant reports that:

"Members who questioned authority, or women who questioned their extreme submission to men, were subject to often traumatic "exorcisms." WOG members were trained to see the world with suspicion and contempt – as an enemy. They believed they were specially chosen by God to fight the Antichrist"

== Split ==
In 1990, the community split over proposals to seek a status that would allow greater local autonomy from Sword of the Spirit. This split came after the investigation of the Word of God community by Bishop Ottenweller, which resulted in Ottenweller ordering the Word of God community to disaffiliate with the Sword of the Spirit.

In 1991 Ralph Martin acknowledged that the practices introduced by the Sword of the Spirit was "an ill-advised venture that led to considerable confusion, turmoil, spiritual distress both in individuals and in the community as a body", "was especially harmful to women", and "fostered elitism".

The Word of God community adopted the proposals, and a faction led by Stephen Clark organised itself as a separate "Washtenaw Covenant Community" (now "Word of Life"), retaining full affiliation with "Sword of the Spirit".

== Mission Christ ==
In the late 1990s the Word of God began a youth outreach called Mission Christ in the Washtenaw County area. Mission Christ began as a weekly meeting, but soon spread to include meetings at many of the local high schools and universities, including: Huron High School (Alpha Omega), Pioneer High School (Pioneers for Christ), Ypsilanti High School, Father Gabriel Richard High School, Dexter High School (Genesis), Eastern Michigan University (Mission Christ Outreach), Concordia College, Washtenaw Community College, and the University of Michigan.

These groups became a source of controversy between the years 2000 and 2004 under the leadership of John Luton. There were two lawsuits filed by individuals against their schools over issues of discrimination against Christians. The first was filed by Betsy Hansen against Pioneer High School after her group, Pioneers for Christ, was allegedly barred from discussion in a forum on homosexuality during the school's diversity fair. Hansen succeeded and was awarded one dollar. The second lawsuit was filed by John Luton against Washtenaw Community College after his group was denied official group status over issues of free speech. In both cases they were represented by attorneys at the Thomas More Law Center. The Hansen case was featured on The O'Reilly Factor and on Hannity and Colmes.
