= Russ Bellant =

American journalist, political activist, and author

Russ Bellant (born 1949) is an American journalist, political activist, and author. He was an Associate of Political Research Associates.

Old Nazis, the New Right, and the Republican Party is Bellant's most widely cited work. Chris Simpson wrote in the preface, "This book presents some of the best new research into the seamy side of the 'Reagan Revolution.'

The Harvard Educational Review calls Old Nazis, the New Right, and the Republican Party an important book "which exposes the roots and growth of domestic fascist networks."

In the same book Bellant documents Nazi involvement in Ukraine; The Nation said "Bellant's exposure of émigré Nazi leaders from Germany's World War II allies in the 1988 Bush presidential campaign was the driving force in the announced resignation of nine individuals, two of them from Ukraine".

Bellant appeared as himself in the political documentary American Secrets.

== Bibliography ==
Books

- The Coors Connection: How Coors Family Philanthropy Undermines Democratic Pluralism. Boston: South End Press, 1991. ISBN 9780896084186. (Archived on 2 July 2021)
- Old Nazis, the New Right, and the Republican Party. (3rd ed.) Boston: South End Press, 1991. 148 p. ISBN 0896084183 / ISBN 978-0896084186. (Archived on 13 November 2020)
  - Revised edition of Old Nazis, the New Right and the Reagan Administration: The Role of Domestic Fascist Networks in the Republican Party and Their Effect on U.S. Cold War Politics. (2nd ed.) Political Research Associates, 1989. 96 p. ISBN 0915987058 / ISBN 978-0915987054.
- The Religious Right in Michigan Politics. Silver Spring, MD: Americans for Religious Liberty, 1996. OCLC 37656468.

Articles

- "LaRouche Loses Libel Suit." Co-authored with Chip Berlet. The Guardian [New York], November 14, 1984.
- "LaRouche Cult Continues to Grow: Researchers Call for Probe of Potentially Illegal Acts." with Chip Berlet & Dennis King. The Public Eye, Vol. 3, Issues 3–4, 1982.
- "The Council for National Policy." CovertAction Information Bulletin, No. 34, Summer 1990, pp. 17–20. Full issue available.
- "Balkan Nationalists Peddling Fascism." Co-authored with Howard Goldenthal. CovertAction Information Bulletin, No. 35, Fall 1990, pp. 27–28. Full issue available.
- "The Free Congress Foundation Goes East." Co-authored with Louis Wolf. CovertAction Information Bulletin, No. 35, Fall 1990, pp. 29–32. Full issue available.
- "G. H. W. Bush Used Nazi Collaborators to Get Elected." Press For Conversion!, No. 54, August 2004, pp. 38–41.

Interviews

- "Secret Ukraine." Interview by Paul H. Rosenberg. Problems of NATO, edited by Tony Simpson. Spokesman Books, December 2017, pp. 13–22. ISBN 9780851248349.
  - Originally published as "Seven Decades of Nazi Collaboration: America’s Dirty Little Ukraine Secret," in Foreign Policy in Focus, March 2014.
