= Bendix =

Bendix may refer to:

== People ==
=== First name ===
- Bendix Hallenstein (1835–1905), New Zealand businessman

=== Middle name ===
- Kim Bendix Petersen (born 1956), Danish singer known by the stage name King Diamond

=== Last name ===
- John E. Bendix (1835–1905), American Civil War and New York Guard general
- Max Bendix (1866–1945), American violinist and conductor
- Peter Bendix (born c. 1984), American professional baseball executive
- Reinhard Bendix (1916–1991), German-American sociologist
- Rigmor Stampe Bendix (1850–1923), Danish baroness and writer
- Simone Bendix (born 1967), Danish actress
- Victor Bendix (1851–1926), Danish composer
- Vincent Hugo Bendix (1881–1945), American inventor and industrialist
- William Bendix (1906–1964), American film, radio, and television actor

== Corporations ==
- Bendix Corporation
- Bendix Helicopters

== Other ==
- Bendix (automobile), a car manufactured in the early 1900s
- Bendix affiliation Philco, Thorn EMI major household appliances
- Bendix drive, part of an automobile starter motor
- Bendix G-15 computer
- Bendix G-20 computer
- Bendix Trophy
- Knuth–Bendix completion algorithm

== See also ==
- Bendiks
