= South Bend Chocolate Company =

American food company

Coordinates: 41°42′27″N 86°20′48″W

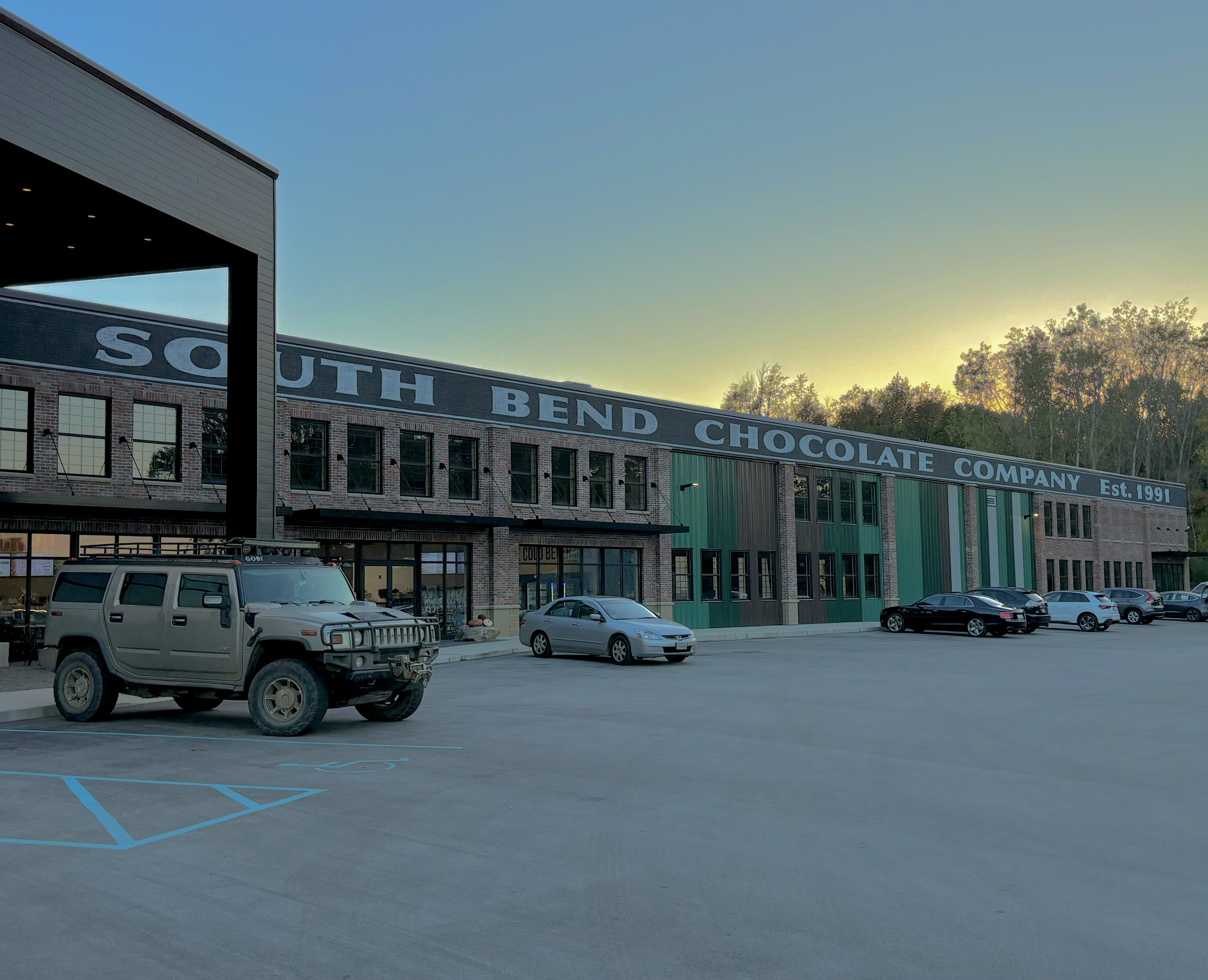
- Type: Domestic For-Profit Corporation
- Industry: Candy & confectionary, retail
- Founded: Oct 24, 1991
- Founder: Mark Tarner
- Headquarters: 7102 Lincolnway W, South Bend, Indiana, United States
- Area served: United States, Midwest
- Key people: Mark Tarner, Kristina Tressler
- Products: Chocolate candy, bulk chocolate, seasonal items, university tie-ins
- Revenue: $20,312,000
- Number of employees: 259
- Website: sbchocolate.com

The South Bend Chocolate Company was established in 1991 by Mark Tarner, a second generation chocolate maker. Along with a chocolate factory, the company has retail stores in the South Bend, Indiana regional area as well as Indianapolis and Ohio. The company's flagship store, the South Bend Chocolate Cafe located on 122 S. Michigan St., is billed as the "World's Largest Chocolate Store" and has been credited with contributing to South Bend's downtown revival. The company expanded its operations to the west side of South Bend with a new factory that opened in July 2024 at 7102 Lincolnway W. The site also features the Indiana Dinosaur Museum along with other attractions.

== Origins & Growth ==
Mark Tarner grew up in South Bend and worked in his father's sweet shop named Sugar 'N Spice. Tarner attended Clay High School in South Bend and later played basketball for Eastern Illinois University eventually earning a master's degree in European history. Tarner and his wife Julie purchased their first home on South Bend's near west side near the Oliver Mansion and the Studebaker National Museum.

The company started by producing candy under a license from the University of Notre Dame. Capitalizing on the proximity of the university, three candies were produced for Notre Dame: the Domer, the Rockne, and Nuts for ND. The company sells chocolate in around a dozen Michiana locations including the South Bend International Airport and St. Joseph Hospital in Mishawaka, Indiana. It also owns and operates three full service restaurants named Public House the latest of which opened at their new museum complex on Lincolnway W. As of 2017, the company has four shareholders, Mark Tarner, Juliet Tarner, Sam Tarner and Kristina Tressler.

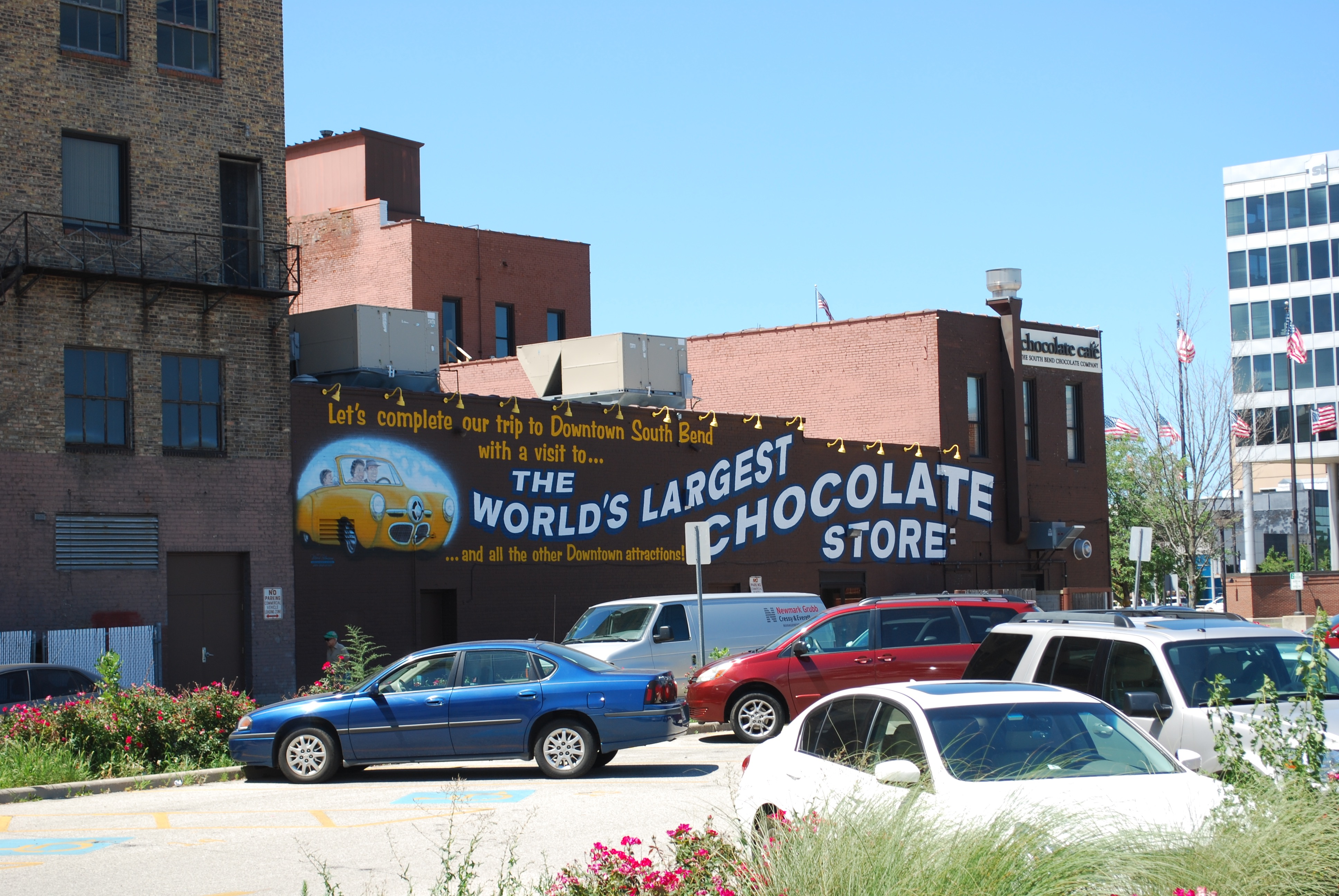
Mural on the back of the South Bend Chocolate Company flagship store in South Bend, IN

Opened on October 16, 1994, the South Bend Chocolate Company's factory was initially located at 3300 W. Sample Street in South Bend in a building that once housed the South Bend Toy Company. The factory featured 60,000 square feet and produced 500 different varieties of chocolate and candy. The facility also included a museum exhibiting a collection of chocolate memorabilia including a 1,300 year old Mayan chocolate pot. The Sample St. factory was a regional tourist site that hosted up to 50,000 visitors per year. Tarner moved the Sample St. operation to the 7102 Linconlway W location on South Bend's west side in June, 2024.

According to South Bend Mayor Pete Buttegieg in 2017, Tarner is "one of the most creative and successful people in South Bend, who believed in South Bend before many other people did".

During the COVID-19 pandemic, Tarner was forced to lay off 200 employees and suspend operations. Tarner obtained a forgivable Paycheck Protection Program loan from the federal government for $1.7 million to help maintain his employees.

Despite the pandemic setback, Tarner established a new 88 acre operations center just west of the South Bend International Airport close to the exit for US Highway 31. The center offers attractions such as the Indiana Dinosaur Museum, hiking and skiing trails, sledding hill, bison conservatory, and restaurants. Tarner received the undeveloped site for $1 from the city's Redevelopment Commission with the stipulation that he must invest at least $5 million in the facility, and he has stated his intention to invest up to $14 million to develop the site. Tarner also received a grant of $500,000 from the Indiana Regional Cities Initiative. In 2017, Tarner encouraged St. Joseph county officials to build a new South Shore train station on the museum campus. A South Shore station is located at the South Bend International Airport and the tracks run just a mile south of the museum site.

== Indiana Dinosaur Museum ==
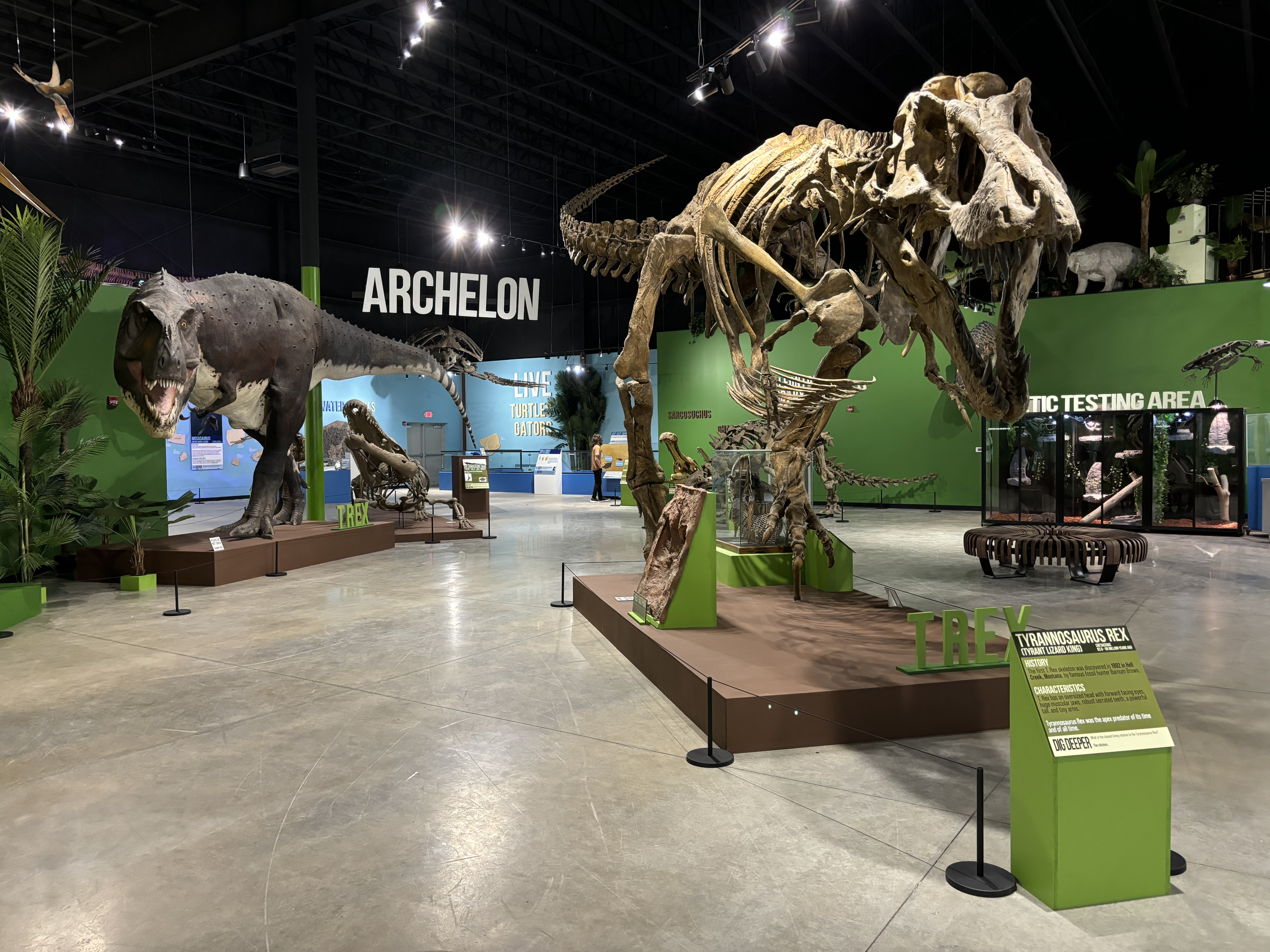
Dinosaur exhibits, Indiana Dinosaur Museum, South Bend, IN

In 2004, Mark Tarner took up paleontology as a hobby and has spent summers excavating dinosaur fossils in Montana. Tarner has accumulated many dinosaur discoveries which were once stored in his various businesses. He also works with Peter Larson of the Black Hills Institute of Geological Research to identify new specimens and prepare museum quality casts.

In 2013, Tarner held a press conference to announce his discovery of an Edmontosaurus on a Montana ranch. Tarner and his brother-in-law Steve Bodi were granted rights to excavate the fossil after the discovery of a vertebra fossil by Montana rancher Steve Curry. The dinosaur skeleton, named Juliet after Tarner's wife, features much of its skin intact, a rare discovery and one of only four such found.

Tarner's passion for paleontology and business skills led him to establish the Indiana Dinosaur Museum which opened on July 12, 2024. Tarner is exhibiting dinosaur skin from the Edmontosaurus discovery in the new museum.

The Dinosaur Museum shares an atrium with the adjacent chocolate museum. Tarner had moved the South Bend Chocolate Company factory and museum from the Sample St. location to new locations within the museum complex. Along with a host of additional attractions, the site's natural beauty is emphasized along with views of the nearby Golden Dome of the University of Notre Dame and proximity to the north–south continental divide. The project also returns buffalo to South Bend with a herd established in a pasture behind the museum.

== See also ==
- List of museums in Indiana
- List of chocolate museums
- Clay High School
- Studebaker National Museum
- The Museums at Washington and Chapin
