= Turcat-Méry =

- Company type: Private
- Industry: Automotive
- Founded: 1899
- Defunct: 1928
- Headquarters: Marseille, Paris and Lunéville, France
- Key people: Simon Méry; Léon Turcat
- Products: Automobiles

Turcat-Méry was a French motor manufacturer from 1899 until 1928. It is now celebrated as the marque that won the inaugural Monte Carlo Rally, but in its prime it was also known for Grand Prix racing and for producing The Car of the Connoisseur. Prior to World War I it was closely associated with the Lorraine-Dietrich company.

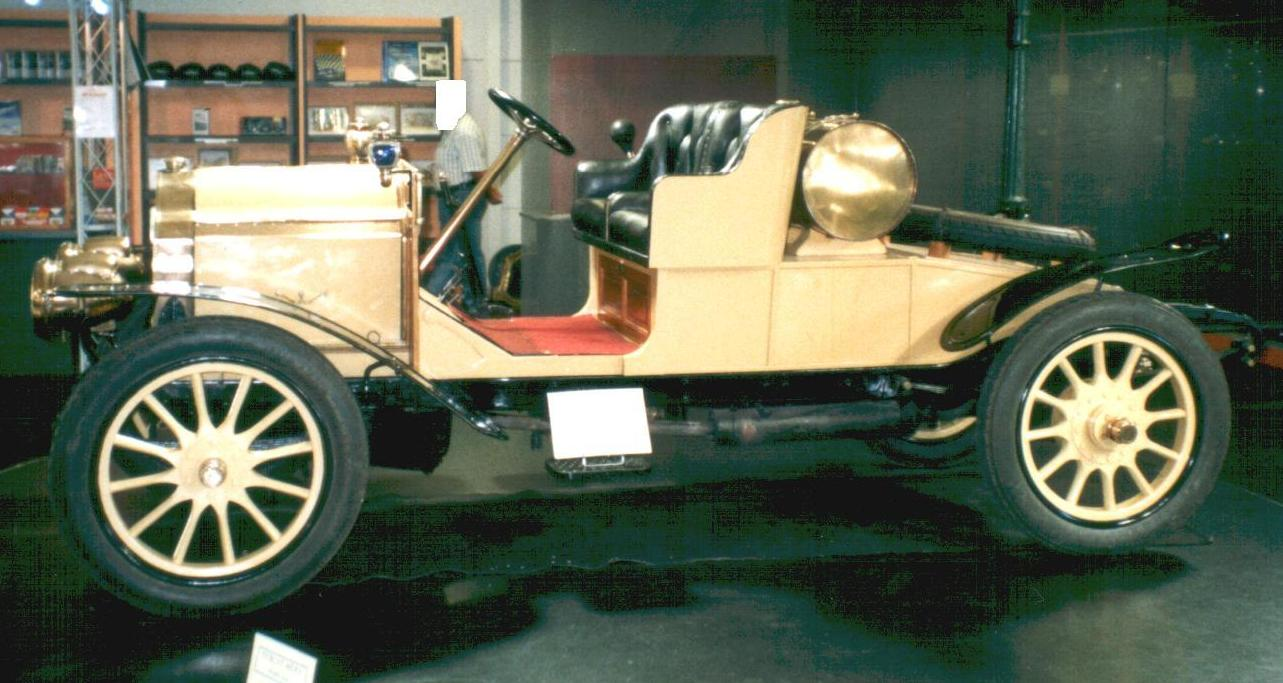
1906 Turcat-Méry

== History ==
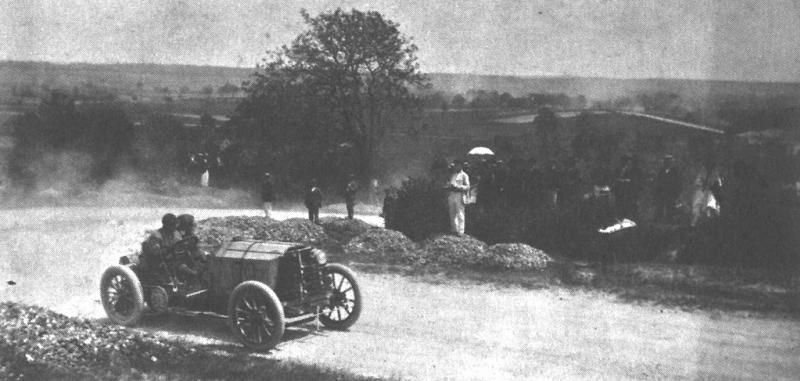
1903 Paris-Madrid race; Henri Rougier driving a Turcat-Méry 45 hp finished 11th overall, and 9th in the heavy car class

In 1895 Alphonse Méry of Marseille bought a Panhard et Levassor and a Peugeot. His younger brother Simon Méry and his brother in law Léon Turcat, both engineers, decided to improve on both models with their own design, a 2.6-litre, four-cylinder, five-speed car with electric ignition, radiators at each end of the engine and two speeds in reverse. Thus in 1899, when the car was ready for sale, they founded Turcat-Méry & Cie. They then established a partnership with Baron Adrien de Turckheim of the De Dietrich and Lorraine-Dietrich, and produced cars whose slogan was The Car of the Connoisseur.

Henri Rougier became the Paris agent and chief publicist for both Turcat-Méry and Lorraine-Dietrich which he achieved by a long and successful career in motor racing and rallying.

Turcat-Méry's liaison with Lorraine-Dietrich lasted until the outbreak of World War I in 1914. Turcat-Méry ceased production in 1928.

== Models ==
The 1899 Turcat-Méry had a 2.6-litre four-cylinder engine with magneto ignition. It also had a radiator at each end of the engine, chain drive and a five-speed gearbox with two speeds in reverse.

Some Turcat-Méry designs were produced by the De Dietrich. In 1907 Turcat-Méry produced their first six-cylinder model, but the four-cylinder models from 2.6 to 6.3 litres continued until the outbreak of World War I in 1914.

After World War I production concentrated on the 15/25 hp (RAC rating of 15.9 hp) with a 3-litre, four-cylinder long-stroke, fixed head engine. It also had a cone clutch and a foot-operated transmission brake.

In the early/mid-1920s, Turcat-Méry introduced an advanced, overhead-camshaft engine.

In the mid-1920s Turcat-Méry attempted to find new markets by switching to smaller-capacity proprietary-engined models, but it was unsuccessful so they ceased car production in 1928.

== Motor racing ==
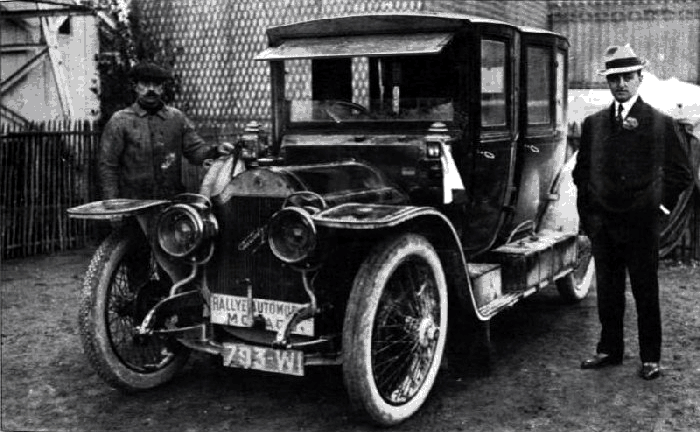
Henri Rougier and the victorious 25 hp Turcat-Méry before the inaugural Monte Carlo rally

Henri Rougier was the main dealer for Turcat-Méry motor vehicles, and like most other manufacturers he used racing and competition as both a technical development and publicity aid for marketing.

In May 1903 Rougier finished 11th overall in the Paris-Madrid race driving a 45 hp Turcat-Méry. He was also classified 9th in the heavy car class.

On 17 June 1904 Rougier competed in the Gordon Bennett Cup race in Germany driving a 45 hp Turcat-Méry. Kaiser Wilhelm II had decreed that the race start from Bad Homburg in the Taunus mountains. Rougier finished in third place, taking 6 hours 46 minutes 31 seconds to complete the 564 kilometres (350 mi).

== Monte Carlo rally ==
In 1909 the Automobile Club de Monaco (Sport Automobile Velocipedique Monegasque) started planning a car rally at the behest of Albert I, Prince of Monaco. The Monte Carlo Rally was to start at points all over Europe and converge on Monte Carlo. In January 1911 23 cars set out from 11 different locations and Rougier was among the nine who left Paris to cover a 1,020 kilometres (634 mi) route. The event was won by Henri Rougier in a Turcat-Méry 45 hp. The rally comprised both driving and then somewhat arbitrary judging based on the elegance of the car, passenger comfort and the condition in which it arrived in the principality. The outcry of scandal when the results were published changed nothing, so Rougier was proclaimed the first winner.

== Rougier — Turcat-Méry ==
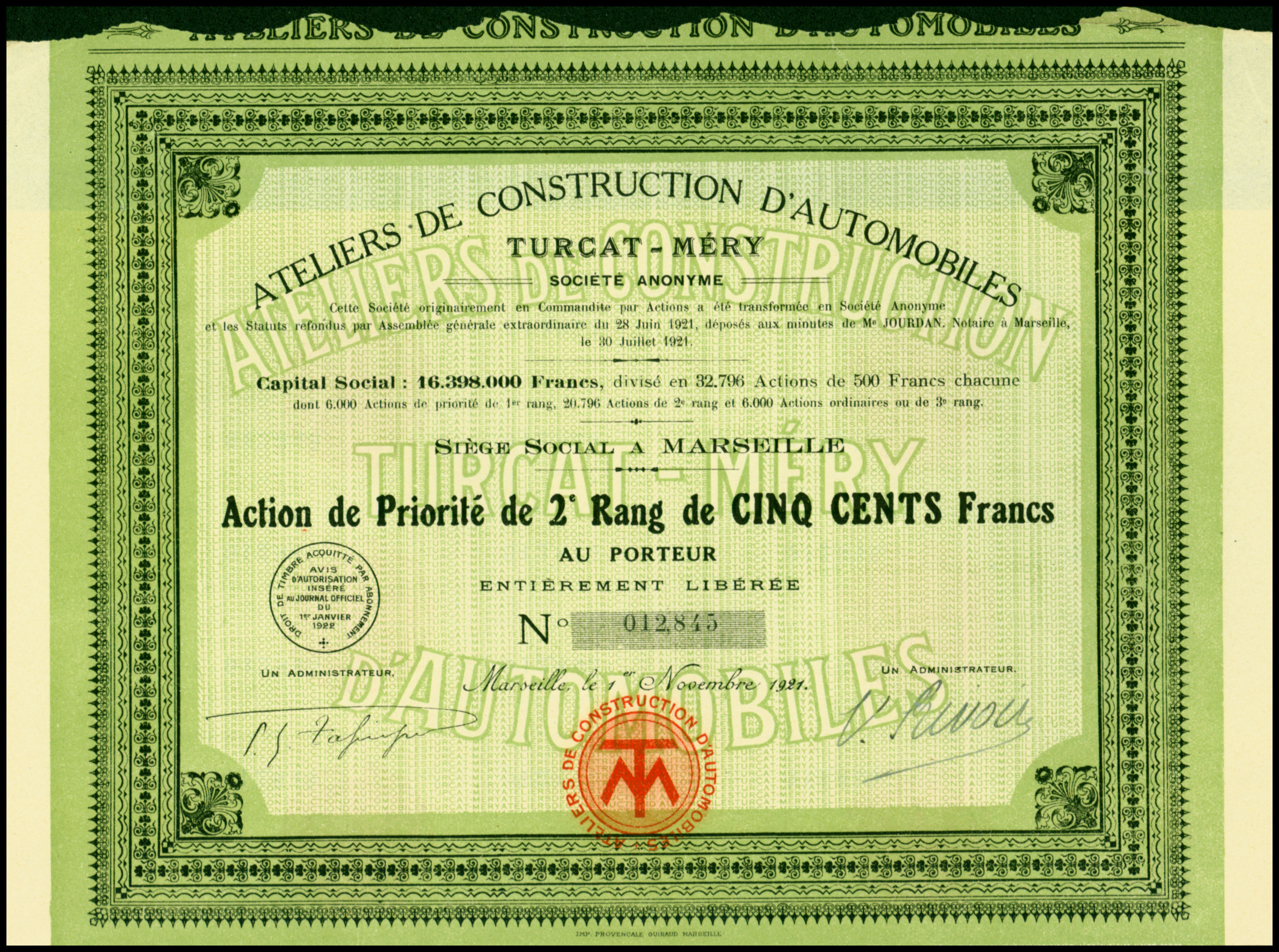
Share of the Ateliers de Construction d'Automobiles Turcat-Méry SA, issued 1 November 1921

After World War I Henri Rougier purchased a limited number of completed 1913/14 Turcat-Méry chassis which he then had reworked to improve the engines and 4-wheel brakes using Henri Perrot's latest drum/shoe brake design.^{[a]} The chassis were then bodied by coach builders such as Million-Guillet in Levallois-Perret, Paris, and the exclusive finished models were badged and registered as 'Rougier'.

== Notes ==
a. Henri Perrot was a French engineer who patented his designs for drum brakes and shoes. In 1924, after meeting at a European auto show, Vincent Bendix acquired the license to manufacture Perrot's shoe-brake patents.
