= Bendix SWC =

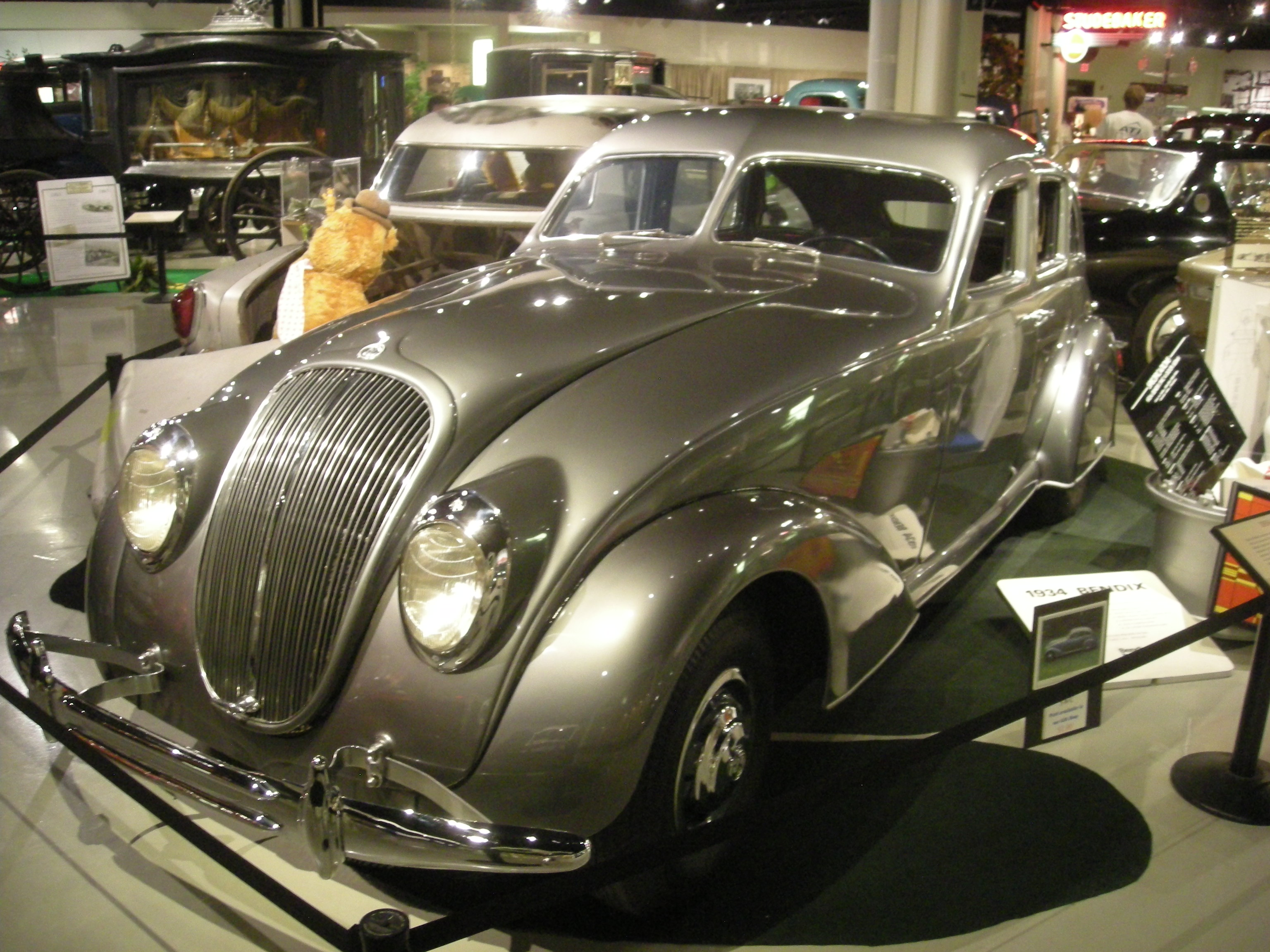

Overview
- Manufacturer: Bendix Corporation
- Model years: 1934

Body and chassis
- Class: Mid-size prototype
- Body style: Four-door, five passenger sedan
- Platform: Box-section central member with front and rear subframes

Powertrain
- Engine: Continental L-head Series 25A straight six

Dimensions
- Wheelbase: 3,048 mm (120.0 in)
- Length: 5,181.6 mm (204.0 in)
- Width: 1,524 mm (60.0 in)
- Height: 1,600.2 mm (63.0 in)
- Curb weight: 1,444.692 kg (3,185.0 lb)

The Bendix SWC is a one-of-a-kind, hand-built prototype concept car built in 1934. It is a four-door, five-passenger sedan that was designed by Alfred Ney of the Bendix Corporation in South Bend, Indiana. Although considered a proof-of-concept vehicle rather than a true prototype for future production, the Bendix SWC is regarded as ahead of its time because of its innovative features, incorporating front-wheel drive, four-wheel hydraulic brakes with open drums for better cooling, and four-wheel independent suspension that used A-arms mounted in rubber blocks in place of conventional springs. The styling was similar to other examples of automotive streamlining such as the contemporary DeSoto Airflow and Chrysler Airflow.

== Development ==
Vincent Bendix and Victor Kliesrath, his vice president in charge of engineering, were instrumental in the design and development of the Bendix SWC. With the acquisition of the Peerless Motor Company in 1931, Bendix began to contemplate a return to automobile production. His early venture from 1907 to 1909 resulted in a limited production of 7,000 vehicles before production ceased.

To show the capabilities of the Bendix Corporation. the new car incorporated many of the Bendix products such as the famed Bendix Startex system, Scintilla magnetos, Stromberg carburetors, Pioneer instruments, and Bragg-Kliesrath vacuum brake boosters. With General Motors, however, as a shareholder in the company and U.S. automakers his main clientele, Bendix feared that his car would be seen as competition to his biggest clients. The top-secret program was set up with a "dummy" company designation, the "Steel Wheel Corporation". The SWC designation on the project was intended to further disguise the true intentions of the project.

With the work carried out in secret, Bendix directed a young engineer, Alfred M. Ney, to design a car based on a unit-body platform with front drive. When the preliminary blueprints were finished, a small team of designers and mechanics was enlisted to flesh out the design. In addition to Ney there were Ottavio Capra, Kliesrath’s chief racing boat mechanic; mechanics Nathan Byer and Charles Lair; and Swiss engineer Fred Thomer. T William F. Ortwig, who had done work for Fisher Body coachbuilders, created a streamlined body design.

After two and a half years of work at the Bendix Automotive Development Center, Benton Harbor, Michigan, at a cost of $84,000, the car was completed, and ready to enter proving trials.

== Design ==
The Bendix SWC was intended to be a unit-body design, but limited time and finances dictated a conventional and heavier steel box frame central member with front and rear subframes. The body construction was orthodox with steel panels mounted over a wooden frame, but curb weight climbed to more than 3,000 pounds, twice the 1,500- to 1,700-pound target weight. To counter the weight gain, aluminum was used for the hood, fenders, doors, and rear wheel skirts. Due to an impending deadline, Ortwig used a DeSoto Airflow grille and headlamp doors to finish the car.

The SWC design featured many technological innovations. The 86-horsepower, straight-six Continental engine and its transaxle were mounted on rubber bushings, as was the rear suspension. The unique powertrain and front-drive, three-speed transaxle mounted in front of the engine could rotate independently of the body. Constant-velocity universal joints transmitted the power to the front wheels. Cooling for the engine came from a complicated latent heat exchanger, eliminating a cooling fan. The novel suspension had limited suspension travel with low-pressure tires taking up road shocks. The SWC used drum brakes that were cooled through openings in the drums and wheelcovers. Although a conventional shift lever was first used, a Bendix "Finger-Tip Control" electrical preselector mechanism, similar to that used by Cord and Hudson automobiles, was substituted. Included in the full instrumentation, a clock was mounted in the center of the steering wheel.

== Introduction ==
In November 1934, despite not having solved the weight problem, which the designer feared would make his suspension unable to cope, Bendix and Kliesrath decided to send the SWC on a European tour of automobile manufacturers. After demonstrations in England for Alvis and Bentley Motors Limited, the car was shipped to France, where the SWC was demonstrated at Citroën, Peugeot, Renault, and Bugatti. The trip was cut short in Genoa, Italy, when a constant-velocity joint broke. Due to the strain of the heavy body and frame, the universal joints had a limited ability to cope with the engine's torque at full left or full right lock, resulting in drivers having to fight the wheel in turns. The heavy SWC also wore out the rubber blocks. The damaged SWC was shipped by rail to Le Havre, France, and loaded on the German liner, SS ‘’Bremen‘’, for return to the United States.

== Cancellation ==
While Bendix and Kliesrath were in Europe, General Motors, worried by the company's plunging stock value and the flamboyant lifestyle by its free-spending CEO, decided to exercise its 25% share in Bendix and force him out. The move also meant an end to the SWC project. The car was not scrapped, but ended up in a shed on the South Bend Bendix Proving Grounds, where it remained in storage for over 30 years until discovered in 1967 by Gene Wadzinski, a Bendix supervisor. After completing, on his own time, a cosmetic overhaul and getting the car running, the Bendix SWC was tested in 1971, but it still exhibited its difficult driving behavior.

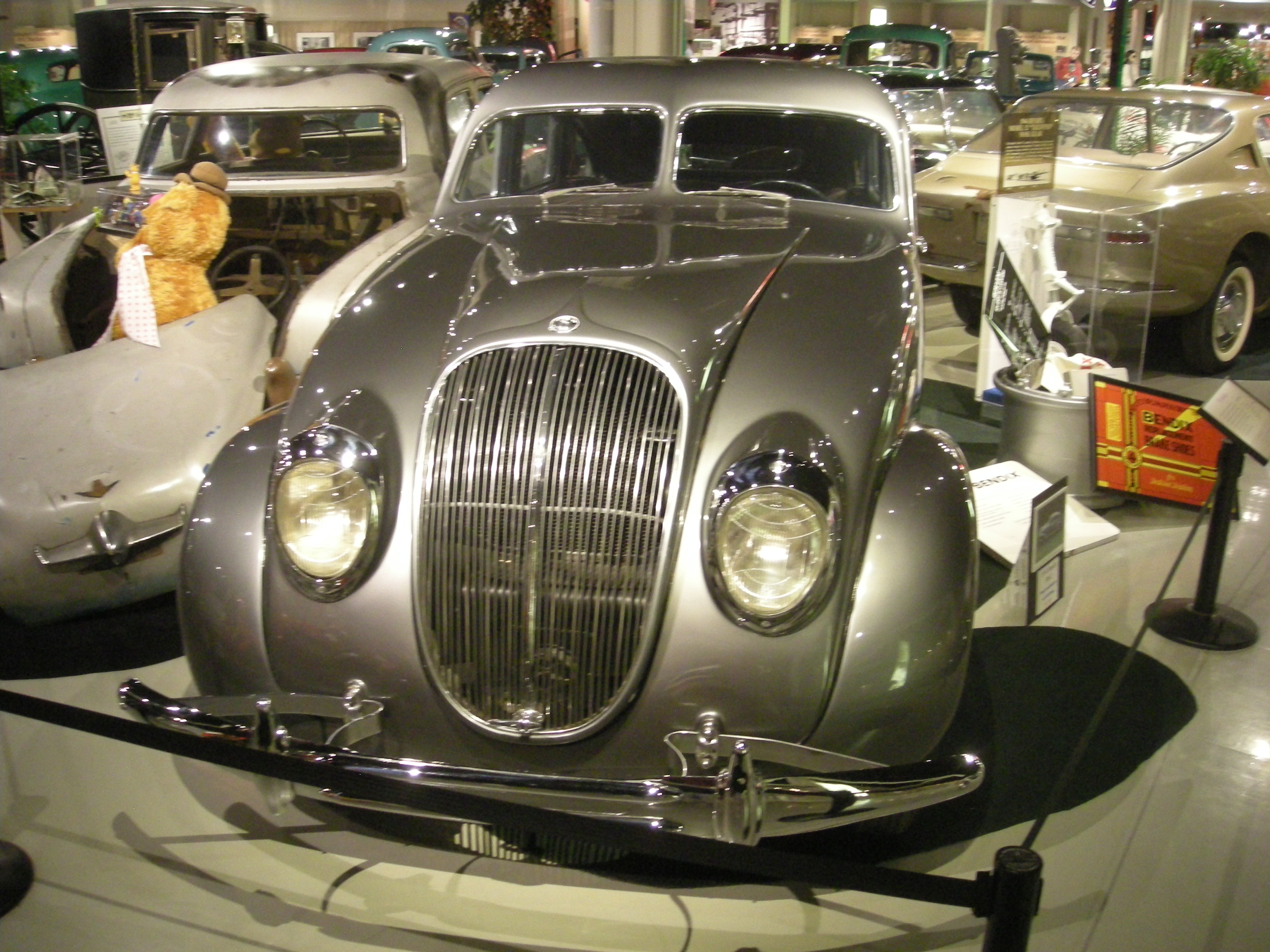
Bendix SWC on display at the Studebaker National Museum

== Disposition ==
The Bendix SWC is now the property of the Studebaker National Museum in South Bend, Indiana. It was donated by the Honeywell Corporation, the successor to the Bendix Corporation.
