= Bendiks =

Bendiks is both a given name and a surname. Notable people with the name include:

- Bendiks H. Arnesen, Norwegian politician
- Bendiks Cazemier (born 1991), Dutch mayor of several Frisian municipalities
- Bärbel Bendiks, East German rower
- Mirjam Jacobson full name: Mirjam Rosa Cohen Bendiks-Jacobson (1887–1945), Dutch painter
- Sascha Bendiks (born 1968), German singer, musician, songwriter and composer

== See also ==
- Bendix (disambiguation)
