= Henri Rougier =

French racing driver and aviator (1876–1956)

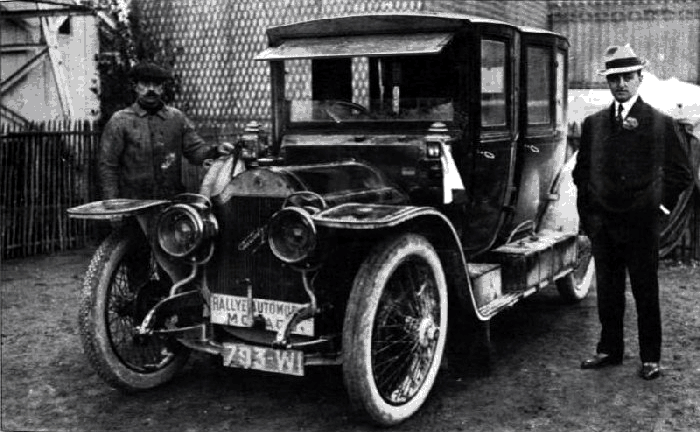
- Rougier and the victorious 25 hp (19 kW) Turcat-Méry before the inaugural Monte Carlo rally
- Born: 28 October 1876; Marseille, France
- Died: 1956 (aged 79–80); Marseille, France
- Occupation: Motor dealer
- Years active: Edwardian – 1900s
- Known for: Pioneering motorist and aviator. Winner of the inaugural Monte Carlo Rally. Chevalier of the Légion d'honneur Croix de Guerre 'Medal of Aeronautics'.

Henri Louis Rougier (28 October 1876 – July 1956) was a French sportsman, racing cyclist, pioneer aeroplane pilot and sporting motorist. He is best remembered for his victory in the inaugural Monte Carlo Rally when he drove his Turcat-Méry from Paris to Monte Carlo, but he was also a regular competitor in both 'City to City' and Grand Prix races.

On 18 November 1909 he was awarded Aviator's Certificate number 11 by the Aéro-Club de France. Throughout 1909 and 1910 he was a very successful competitor at air shows and Grands Prix throughout Europe.

Rougier was a successful entrepreneur, owning the Paris agency for Turcat-Méry motor cars, and using his motor racing and rallying prowess to garner publicity. After World War I he manufactured a limited number of Rougier motor cars, based on Turcat-Méry chassis but with mechanical design improvements and exclusive coach-built bodies.

Rougier was appointed Chevalier of the Légion d'honneur, plus being awarded the Croix de Guerre and the 'Medal of Aeronautics'.

== Family life ==
Rougier was born in Marseille, on 28 October 1876.

== Motoring ==
=== Motor racing ===
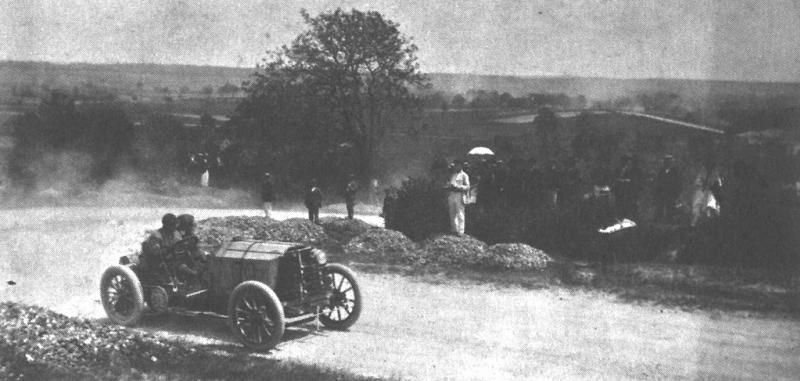
1903 Paris-Madrid race. Henri Rougier driving his Turcat-Méry 45-hp finished 11th overall, and 9th in the heavy car class

Henri Rougier was the main dealer for Turcat-Méry motor vehicles, and like most other manufacturers he used racing and competition as both a technical development and publicity aid for marketing.

In May 1903 Rougier finished 11th overall in the Paris-Madrid race driving a 45-hp Turcat-Méry. He was also classified 9th in the heavy car class.

On 17 June 1904 Rougier competed in the Gordon Bennett Cup race in Germany driving a 45-hp Turcat-Méry. Kaiser Wilhelm II had decreed that the race start from Bad Homburg in the Taunus mountains. He finished in third place, taking 6 hours 46 minutes 31 seconds to complete the 564 kilometres (350 mi).

In 1905 Rougier competed in the Circuit des Ardennes at Bastogne. His Lorraine-Dietrich set the fastest lap of 68.51 mph.

In 1906 Rougier finished third in the Circuit des Ardennes at Bastogne, driving a Lorraine-Dietrich. His time was 5 hours 50 minutes 11 seconds. At the inaugural 1906 French Grand Prix he was unclassified, over 1 lap behind the winner.

In 1907 Rougier competed in the French Grand Prix at Dieppe, driving a Lorraine-Dietrich but retired on lap 5.

On 19 May 1908 Rougier competed in the Saint Petersburg-Moscow race driving a Lorraine-Dietrich but retired early. In the 1908 French Grand Prix at Dieppe, he retired on the first lap with magneto problems on his Lorraine-Dietrich.

In 1923 Rougier competed in the French Grand Prix at Tours, driving a 'Voisin Laboratoire' he retired after 19 laps. In the 1923 Italian Grand Prix at Monza he retired after 28 laps.

=== Monte Carlo rally ===
In 1909 the Automobile Club de Monaco (Sport Automobile Velocipedique Monégasque) started planning a car rally at the behest of Albert I, Prince of Monaco. The Monte Carlo Rally was to start at points all over Europe and converge on Monte Carlo. In January 1911 23 cars set out from 11 different locations and Rougier was among the nine who left Paris to cover a 1,020 kilometres (634 mi) route.

The event was won by Henri Rougier in a Turcat-Méry 25 Hp. The rally comprised both driving and then somewhat arbitrary judging based on the elegance of the car, passenger comfort and the condition in which it arrived in the principality. The outcry of scandal when the results were published changed nothing, so Rougier was proclaimed the first winner.

=== Motor manufacture ===
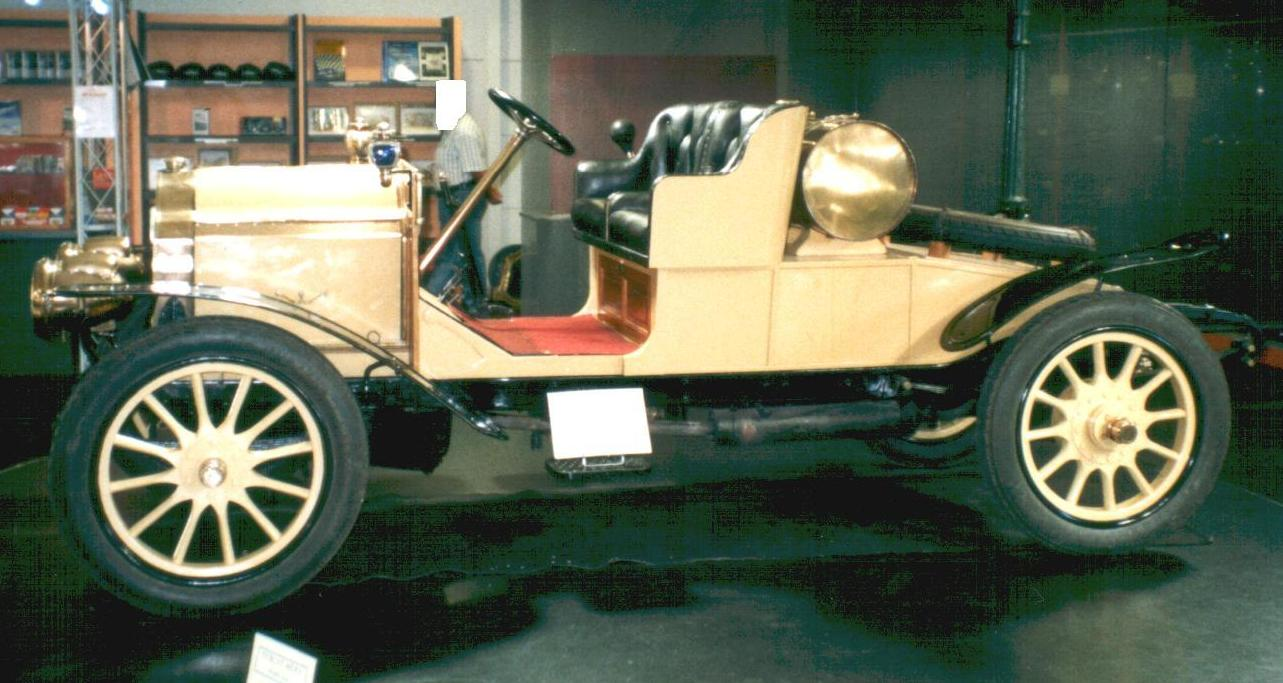
1906 Turcat-Méry

The Turcat-Méry motor manufacturing business began in 1895 when Alphonse Méry of Marseille bought a Panhard-Levassor and a Peugeot. His younger brother Simon Méry and his brother in law Léon Turcat, both engineers, decided to improve on both models with their own design, a 2.6-litre, four cylinder, five speed car with electric ignition, radiators at each end of the engine and two speeds in reverse. Thus in 1899, when the car was ready for sale, they founded Turcat-Méry & Cie.

They then established a partnership with Baron Adrien de Turckheim fr:Adrien de Turckheim of the De Dietrich and Lorraine-Dietrich company, and produced cars whose slogan was The Car of the Connoisseur. Rougier became the Paris agent and chief publicist for both Turcat-Méry and Lorraine-Dietrich. The liaison with Lorraine-Dietrich lasted until the outbreak of World War I in 1914. Turcat-Méry ceased production in 1928.

After World War I Rougier purchased a limited number of completed 1913/14 Turcat-Méry chassis which he then had reworked to improve the engines and four-wheel brakes using Henri Perrot's latest drum/shoe brake design. (Note: Henri Perrot was a French engineer who patented his designs for drum brakes and shoes.fr:Henri Perrot In 1924, after meeting at a European auto show, Vincent Bendix acquired the license to manufacture Perrot's shoe-brake patents.) The chassis were then bodied by coach-builders such as Million Guillet in Levallois-Perret Paris and the exclusive finished models were badged and registered as 'Rougier'.

== Aviation ==
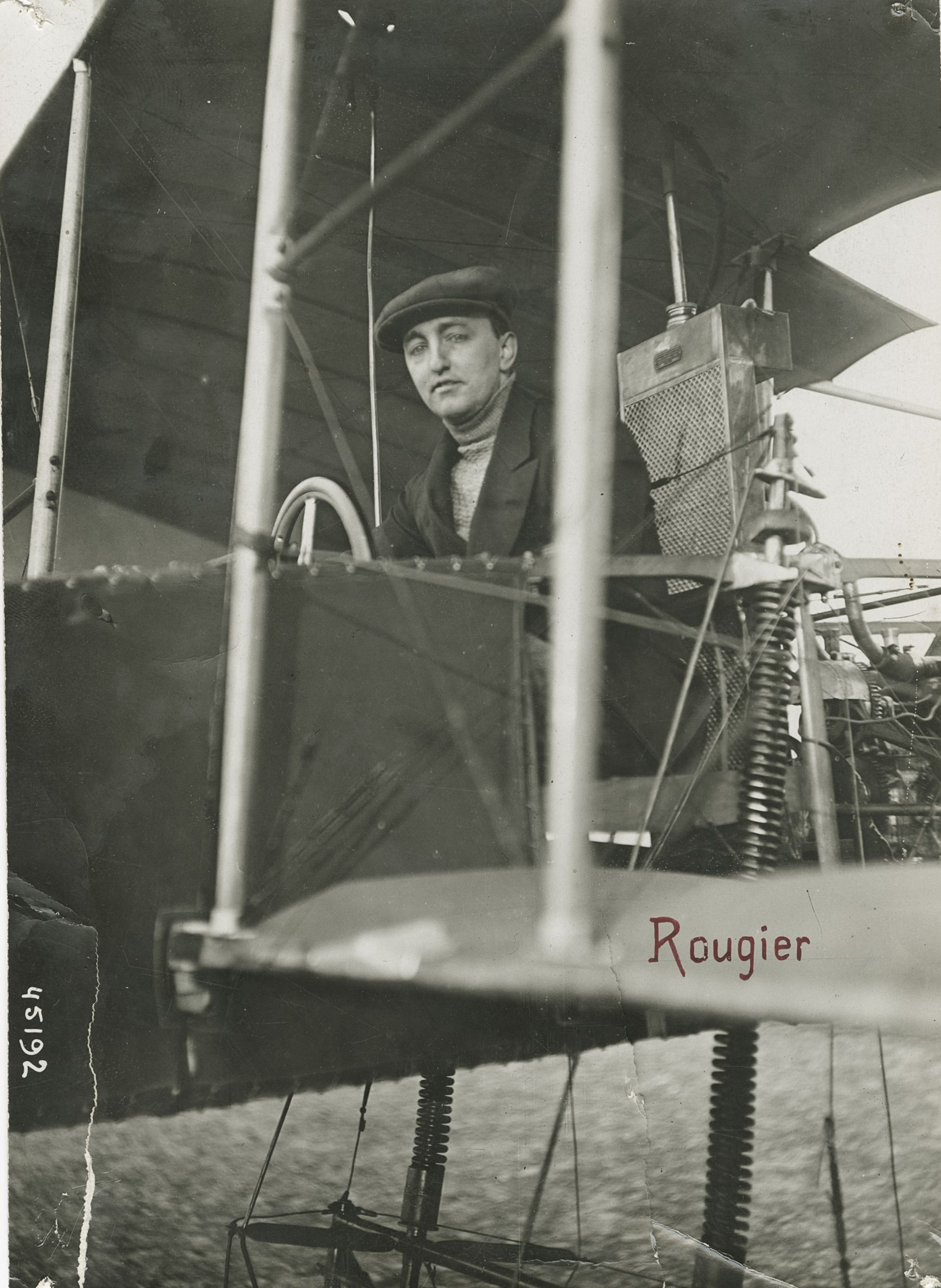
Henri Rougier in 1910

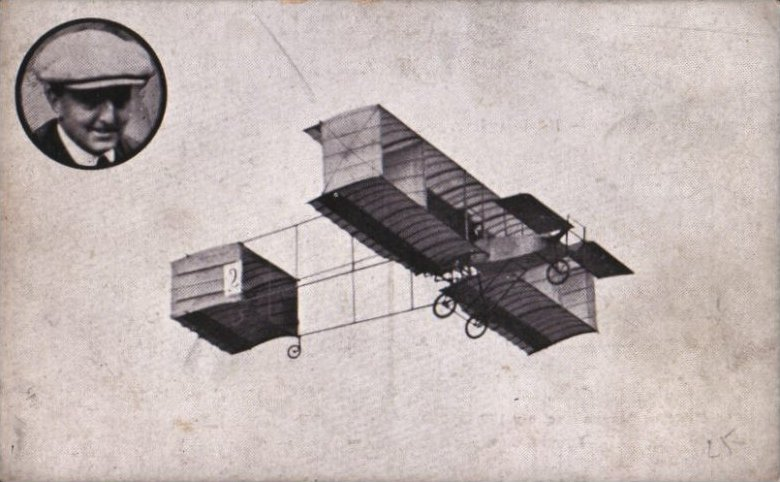
Anvers Aviation Meeting in 1909. Henri Rougier flying a Voisin biplane powered by a Gnôme Oméga engine

In 1909, Rougier learned to fly in a Voisin powered by a Gnome Omega engine. On 18 November 1909 he was awarded Aviator's Certificate number 11 by the Aéro-Club de France. In September 1909 he won the prizes for distance and altitude at the Grand Prix of Berlin, while fellow Frenchman Hubert Latham won the prize for speed. The Grand Prix was the first aviation tournament held in Germany, having been triggered by the public enthusiasm for Orville Wright's demonstration flights at Templehoff and Potsdam in August 1909.

At the 1909 Air Show in Brescia, Italy in September Rougier again won the altitude prize, beating Glen Curtiss in the Curtiss No. 2. He also competed in the 1909 Air meetings at Frankfurt, Germany and Blackpool, England where he finished in second place. Then in Antwerp (Anvers) he won all the races.

At the Air Show in Heliopolis in Egypt, he won first prize for 'aggregate distance' and second prize for 'longest distance without stopping'.

In January 1910 in Monaco he became renowned for his exploits over both the Mediterranean Sea and Mount Agel. He described one particularly dangerous trip from Monaco to Nice in high, changeable winds:

"I left [Monaco] in a calm wind. Crossing the Cap d'Ail I was hit by a sheer wind that stopped the plane and tossed it like a rubber ball. ... I was expecting to be hurled into the sea but suddenly was thrown 200 metres [656 ft] in the air, out of control. ... I tried in vain to turn to escape the wind! After several attempts I finally headed downwind, travelling over 100 km per hour [62 mph] towards the Bay of Menton where I hoped to find shelter and ditch in the sea, but, by the grace of god, after passing the Rock of Monaco, I found calmer winds and managed to land safely.

... At that moment in Nice the violent wind destroyed the hangars for the Air-show where I had planned to land.

... In a fifteen minute flight I had experienced total fear and an instinct for self-preservation. ... On landing on terra firma I was soaked with sweat despite the icy wind, arms bruised, breathless, happy, relieved but nonetheless upset that the elements had stopped me from achieving my goal. Henri Rougier,

In 1910 he is reported to have competed in California with the Voisin; this is presumed to be the California horse racing course outside Nice.

=== Endurance flying ===
In an age when endurance flights were a considerable achievement and of sufficient risk to be publicly noteworthy, Rougier's performances were included in the tables of Flight International magazine.

- 12 Sept 1909: Voisin: Brescia: 1 hour 9 minutes
- 28 Sept 1909: Voisin: Johannisthal Air Field: 1 hour 20 minutes
- 29 Sept 1909: Voisin: Johannisthal Air Field: 1 hour 37 minutes
- 28 Oct 1909: Voisin: Antwerp: 1 hour 3 minutes
- 6 Feb 1910: Voisin: Heliopolis in Egypt: 65 kilometres (40 mi)
- 11 Feb 1910: Voisin: Heliopolis: 48 kilometres (30 mi)

=== Aircraft manufacture ===
In 1910 Rougier became a partner of Antoine Odier and Raoul Vendôme in the Odier-Vendôme aeroplane company, building the Odier-Vendôme biplane. Rougier flew the aircraft at locations such as Issy-les-Moulineaux and Terni and Ghedi in Italy.

Rougier may also have been involved in the independent construction of a 'Rougier' biplane, although there is only a single, hard to identify, photograph which may show a standard Voisin that was owned by Rougier.

== Death, honours and commemoration ==
In retirement he lived at La Valette-du-Var, near Toulon. In July 1956 he died of heart failure.

Henri Rougier was appointed Chevalier of the Légion d'honneur. He was awarded the Croix de Guerre and the 'Medal of aeronautics'.
