= Clay High School (Indiana) =

Public school in Indiana, United States

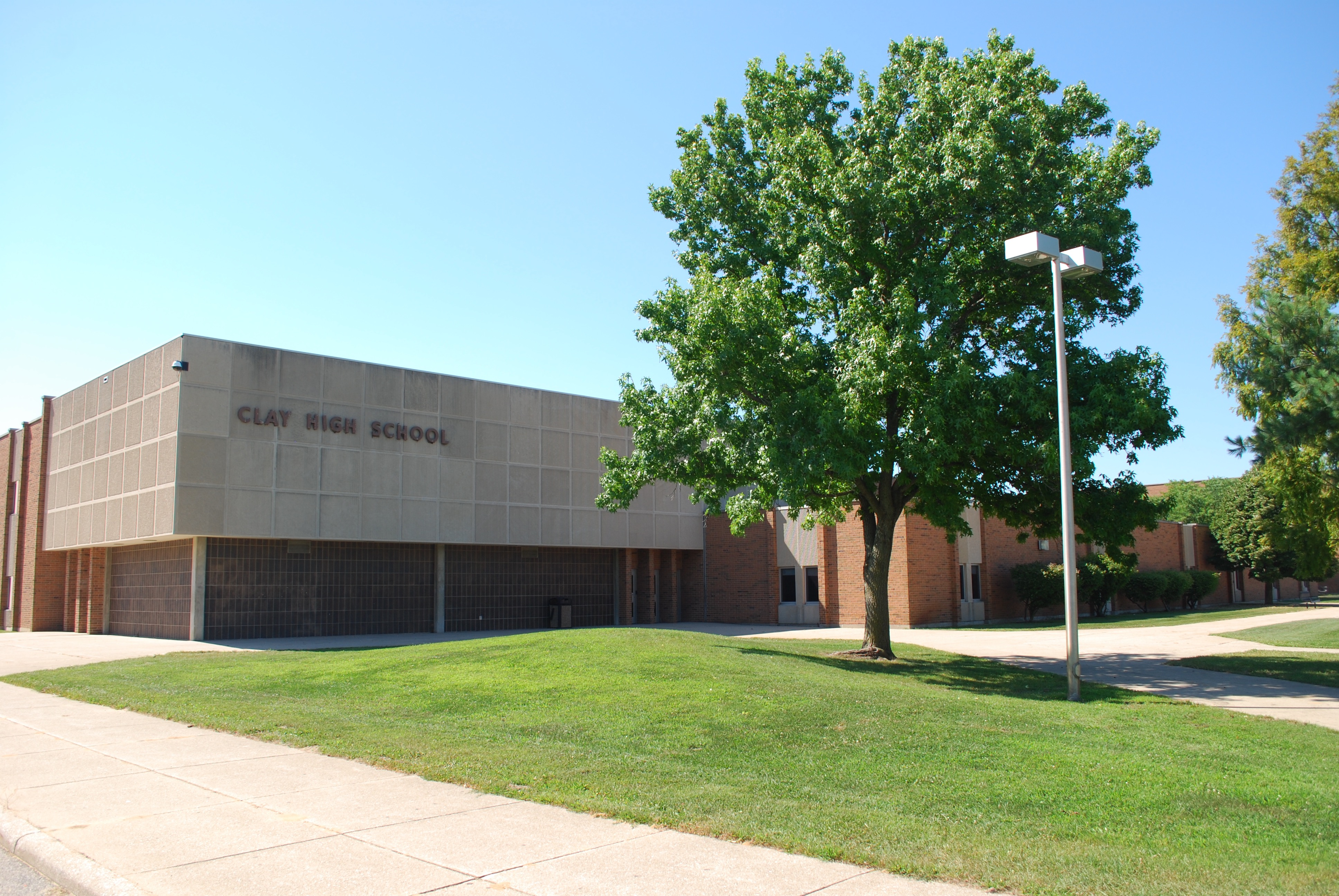

Location
- 19131 Darden Road; South Bend postal address, Indiana 46637; United States; 41°43′53″N 86°14′19″W

Information
- Type: Public high school
- Established: 1930
- School district: South Bend Community School Corporation
- Principal: Kemilyn Schreiber
- Staff: 77.32 (FTE)
- Grades: 9–12
- Enrollment: 628 (2022–23)
- Student to teacher ratio: 12.78
- Campus: Suburban
- Color
- Song: Notre Dame Fight song
- Athletics conference: Northern Indiana Athletic Conference
- Mascot: A colonial
- Nickname: Colonials
- Newspaper: The Colonial
- Yearbook: Minuteman
- Feeder schools: None
- Website: ClayHS School website

Clay High School was a public high school located in Clay Township, St. Joseph County, Indiana. It was the Fine Arts school in the South Bend Community School Corporation magnet program. It was dedicated in 1930, with a newer building dedicated in 1976, and closed following the 2023–2024 school year, with the future use of the building undecided as of 2026.

== Notable alumni ==
- Jaraan Cornell – basketball player
- Jon Gruden – NFL head coach and professional football broadcaster
- Lee Nailon – basketball player
- John Newcomer – game designer
- Dean Norris – actor
- Don Schlundt – basketball player
- David Simkins – screenwriter and television producer
- Mark Tarner – entrepreneur, president of the South Bend Chocolate Co.

== See also ==
- List of high schools in Indiana
