= Henri Perrot =

French engineer (1883–1961)

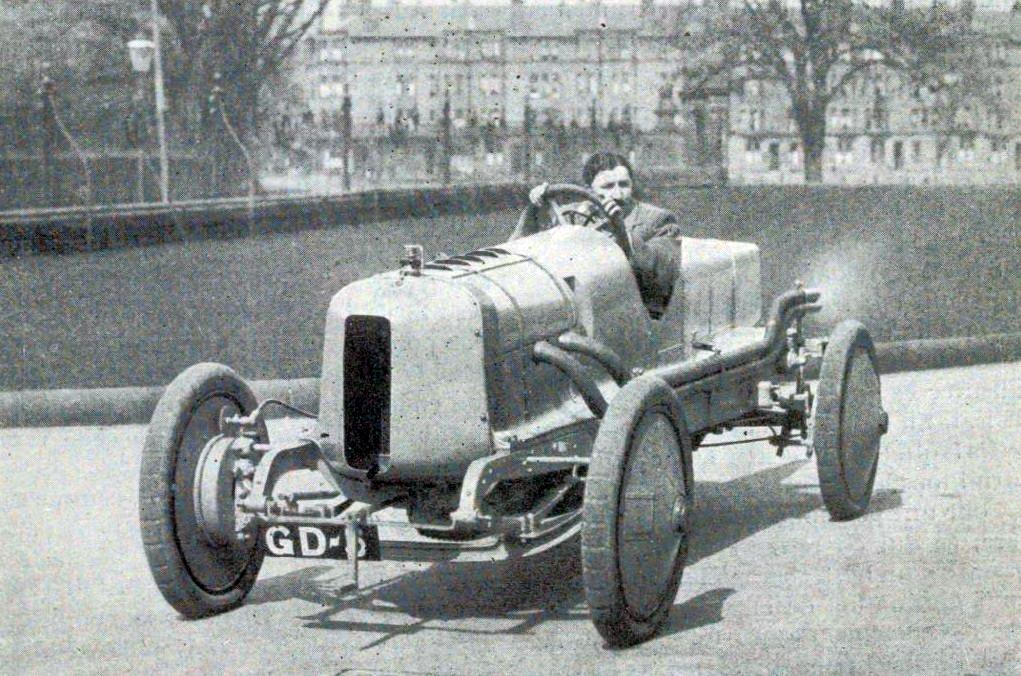
- Henri Perrot in an Argyll record breaking car.
- Born: 21 August 1883; Paris, France
- Died: 1961; Monte Carlo
- Occupation: Engineer
- Known for: Automobile brakes

Henri Perrot (French: [ɑ̃ʁi pɛʁo]; 21 August 1883 – 1961, in Paris) was a French engineer who was one of the pioneers of the automobile industry from the late nineteenth and early twentieth centuries. He was awarded numerous patents in the field of automotive drum/shoe braking.

== Early life ==
Henri Perrot was born on 21 August 1883 at Place Saint-Charles, Paris, the son of Françoise Esterle and François Perrot who worked at the Brasier car factory. He studied at Jean-Baptiste-Say High School before gaining a scholarship to the Arts et Métiers ParisTech engineering school in 1888 at the age of 16.

When he left school in 1902, he went to Brasier and helped design the car that would win the Gordon Bennett Cup in 1904 and 1905. The car was driven by Léon Théry. For this Henri Perrot receives the Grand Bronze Medal of the Conseil national des professions de l'automobile (CSCA), "as a reward for the service rendered to the French Automobile Industry, contributing in a large extent to the construction of the car that retained Gordon Bennett Trophy."

== Argyll ==
In 1908, Henri Perrot left Brasier and went to work for Argyll in Alexandria, West Dunbartonshire, Scotland and while there filed his first patent for a system of front wheels brakes (British Patent No. 6807 March 18, 1910 by Henri Perrot and Rubury).

At the London Olympia Motor Show in November 1910, a 12-hp Argyll car with pedal-operated front brakes and lever-operated rear brakes was displayed. At the 1912 London Show, Argyll introduced a 15 hp car with brakes on all four wheels simultaneously operated by either pedal or lever at the choice of the driver. This system was patented in the United States on 21 October 1913.

In 1912 and 1913 he designed a car for Argyll with a valveless engine and with a worm-gear rear axle. In May 1913 the car beat the world record for duration and distance for 7, 8, 9, 10, 11, 12, 13, and 14 hours, and 600, 700, 800, 900, and 1000 miles.

In August 1914, at the declaration of World War I, 1500 Argyll cars equipped with the Perrot braking system had been made in the United Kingdom.

== Adoption by other companies ==
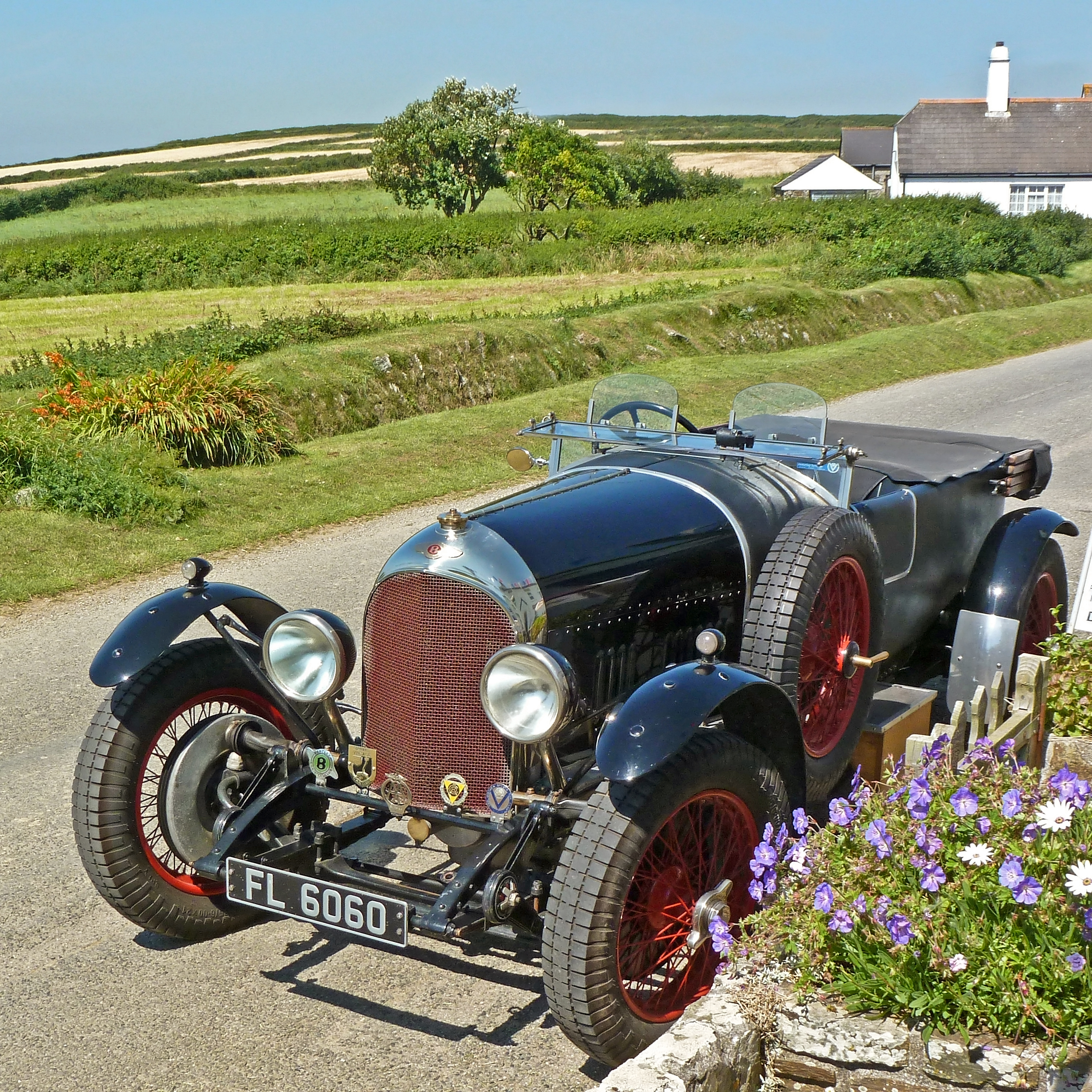
Bentley 3 Litre with Perrot front brakes

In 1919, Delage licensed the Perrot braking system and fitted it to their 6-cylinder chassis, it was also used by Hispano-Suiza on a car designed by Marc Birkigt with a mechanical servo and Henri Rougier reworked a limited quantity of his 1913/14 Turcat-Méry chassis including adding 4-wheel brakes using Henri Perrot's latest drum/shoe brake design. In June 1919 Talbot obtained a license for the braking system. Negotiations took place in 1920 with Renault, but were unsuccessful. However, at the 1920 Motor Show, Henri Perrot demonstrated his brakes on a Renault vehicle resulting in a license being taken up by them in 1921. By 1925, more than fifty car brands around the world were using the braking system.

At the 1924 24 Hours of Le Mans the first three cars (1st Bentley 3 Litre, 2nd and 3rd Lorraine-Dietrich B3-6) were all equipped with Perrot brakes.

== Bendix Corporation ==
In 1924, after meeting at a European auto show, Vincent Hugo Bendix acquired the license to manufacture Perrot's shoe-brake patents and set up the Bendix Corporation with a factory in South Bend, Indiana.

== Later life ==
Henri Perrot retired in 1949 from Bendix. He remained as a consulting engineer for the French branch of Lockheed in Saint-Ouen and also Ame du Ferodo. He was president of the Society of Automotive Engineers from 1950 to 1953 and became a chevalier of the Order of the Legion of Honour on 13 February 1949 and commander of the Spanish Civil Merite in October 1952.

In 1956, he co-authored the book "The Braking of Motor Vehicles on the Road" published by Eyrolles in Paris.

He died in 1961 in Monte Carlo.

== See also ==
- Bendix Corporation
- Vincent Bendix
- Henri Rougier
