= Jaraan Cornell =

American basketball player (1976–2025)

Personal information
- Born: November 22, 1976 South Bend, Indiana, U.S.
- Died: June 6, 2025 (aged 48) South Bend, Indiana, U.S.
- Listed height: 6 ft 3 in (1.91 m)
- Listed weight: 200 lb (91 kg)

Career information
- High school: Clay (South Bend, Indiana)
- College: Purdue (1996–2000)
- NBA draft: 2000: undrafted
- Position: Shooting guard
- Number: 22
- Coaching career: 2013–2014

Career history

Playing
- 2000–2001: Gary Steelheads

Coaching
- 2013–2014: Clay HS (girls')

Career highlights
- 2× Third-team All-Big Ten (1998, 1999); Third-team Parade All-American (1996)

Jaraan V. Cornell (November 22, 1976 – June 6, 2025) was an American basketball player. He played college basketball for the Purdue Boilermakers.

== High school career ==
Born and raised in South Bend, Indiana, Cornell attended Clay High School. Playing for head coach Tom DeBaets, he was a third-team Parade All-American, finished third in voting for the Mr. Indiana Basketball Award and was a top 30 recruit during his senior season. He averaged 21.8 points, 8.9 rebounds a 3.2 assists a game while leading the team in blocks, with 24. He scored his high school career high with 36 points against city rivals Washington High. During his sophomore season, he led the Colonials with 30 points and onto the 1994 State Championship against Valparaiso, a team led by the state's Mr. Basketball, Bryce Drew, who would later play at Valparaiso University and the NBA. In the state championship game, Cornell completed his team's stunning late-game comeback by swishing a game-tying three-pointer as time expired from the top of the key. He was teamed with South Bend native and former NBA player, Lee Nailon.

== College career ==
=== 1996–97 season ===
Jaraan received a scholarship to attend Purdue University in West Lafayette, Indiana, where he played basketball for head coach Gene Keady and assistants Frank Kendrick and Bruce Weber. As a freshman, he averaged 10.2 points a game and recorded a total of 46 steals. He shot 36.1 percent from beyond the arc, while shooting 50 percent or better in half of the 30 games in which he appeared. Along with fellow freshman Brian Cardinal and juniors Chad Austin and Brad Miller, he led the Boilermakers to the 1997 NCAA tournament.

=== 1997–98 season ===
During his sophomore season, Cornell appeared in 28 of 36 games and averaged 12.8 points a game. He set a school record while leading the Big Ten Conference with a .500 three-point field goal percentage on the season, breaking Woody Austin's .485 Purdue season mark. On January 21, Cornell had a career high made 7 three-pointers against Ohio State. He started the opening 25 games until he sprained his left ankle against Indiana on February 10, where he missed the following eight games. Cornell came back from his injury and helped lead the Boilers to a Sweet Sixteen appearance and on to a 28–8 record. He was a Third Team All-Big Ten selection.

=== 1998–99 season ===
As a second straight Third Team All-Big Ten selection and starting every game during his junior season, he led Purdue in scoring, with 15.3 points, while also leading the team with 30.7 minutes a game. He connected on 85 three-pointers on the season, which is the program's fourth most in a single season and also set a school record with 245 attempts. He scored a career-high 30 points on February 13, 1999, at Illinois. He led the Boilers to a second straight Sweet Sixteen appearance.

=== 1999–2000 season ===
As a senior, he started all 33 games that he played and scored in double figures 25 times to lead the team. He was Purdue's second leading scorer behind Brian Cardinal with 12.5 a game and grabbed a career-best 141 rebounds on the season. Cornell led the Boilermakers to an Elite Eight appearance, losing to Wisconsin the third time on the season.

=== College notes ===
The silky smooth left-handed shooter, who's nicknamed "J-Kool," became one of the program's foremost shooters. Cornell left Purdue holding the school record for most three-point field goals made in a career, connecting with 242 treys, while also having the record for most attempts, with 656. Only behind Brian Walker, Chris Kramer and Brian Cardinal, he has the fourth most steals in a career with 176 take-aways.

== Professional career ==
After going undrafted in the 2000 NBA draft, Cornell was selected by the Gary Steelheads in the 2000 CBA Draft, along with former Purdue teammates Carson Cunningham and Chad Austin. He played under former Purdue assistant and first-year head coach Frank Kendrick in the franchise's first season.

== Post-playing career ==
Cornell was the coach of the girls' basketball team at Clay High School during the 2013 and 2014 seasons. He was the program director at Heroes Camp in Mishawaka, Indiana. At the time of his death, Cornell had most recently worked at the Boys and Girls Club of the Northern Indiana Corridor.

== Death ==
Cornell was found dead at his South Bend apartment, on June 6, 2025, at the age of 48. His death was determined to be from natural causes.
