= Frank Kendrick =

American basketball player (1950–2024)

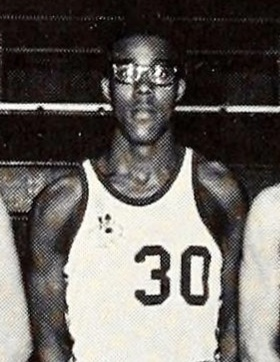
- Kendrick with the Arsenal Tech basketball team in 1970

Personal information
- Born: September 11, 1950 Indianapolis, Indiana, U.S.
- Died: December 18, 2024 (aged 74) Indianapolis, Indiana, U.S.
- Listed height: 6 ft 6 in (1.98 m)
- Listed weight: 198 lb (90 kg)

Career information
- High school: Arsenal Tech (Indianapolis, Indiana)
- College: Purdue (1971–1974)
- NBA draft: 1974: 3rd round, 47th overall pick
- Drafted by: Golden State Warriors
- Playing career: 1974–1985
- Position: Small forward
- Number: 34
- Coaching career: 1989–2001, 2009–2011

Career history

Playing
- 1974–1975: Golden State Warriors
- 1975: Sacramento Prospectors
- 1975-76: Baltimore Claws
- 1975-1979: Kortrijk (PBL Belgium)
- 1979–1980: Caen

Coaching
- 1989–1999: Purdue (assistant)
- 2000–2001: Gary Steelheads
- 2009–2011: Arsenal Tech HS

Career highlights
- First-team All-Big Ten (1974); NIT champion (1974)

Career statistics
- Points: 80 (3.3 ppg)
- Rebounds: 36 (1.5 rpb)
- Assists: 6 (0.3 apg)
- Stats at NBA.com
- Stats at Basketball Reference

Frank Edward Kendrick (September 11, 1950 – December 18, 2024) was an American professional basketball player and coach. He played college basketball for the Purdue Boilermakers and was selected by the Golden State Warriors in the 1974 NBA draft. He spent part of the 1974–75 season with the Warriors and then spent the next ten years playing professionally in Europe. He served as an assistant coach for the Boilermakers from 1989 to 1999 and as head coach for the Gary Steelheads of the Continental Basketball Association during the 2000–01 season.

== Early life ==
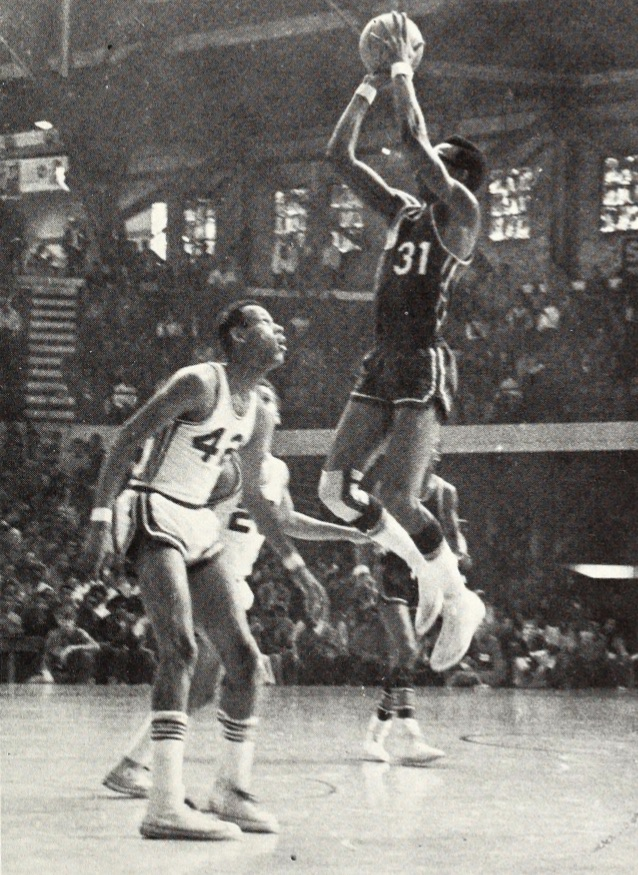
Kendrick shoots the ball over a defender while playing for Arsenal Tech High School in 1970

Kendrick was born as the seventh of nine children to parents George and Odesta Kendrick. He attended Arsenal Technical High School in Indianapolis, Indiana, where he was an All-American selection.

== College career ==
Kendrick attended Purdue University, located in West Lafayette, Indiana. He played basketball under head coach George King in his sophomore season. Playing under Fred Schaus in his last two seasons at Purdue, he led the Boilers to the 1974 NIT Championship, scoring a team high 25 points against Utah. He was selected as the team MVP and as a First Team All-Big Ten selection during his Junior and Senior seasons while averaging 18.5 points per game in both seasons. He was named a Helms Athletic Foundation All-American following his senior season. He finished his career at Purdue with 1,269 points, #22 All-Time at Purdue; 664 rebounds (#9 All-Time) and 29 double-doubles. Frank helped lead the team to an overall 48–30 record in his three varsity seasons, which includes a 24–18 Big Ten Conference record.

== Professional career ==
=== Golden State Warriors ===
Kendrick was the 47th pick in the 3rd round of the 1974 NBA draft. He played one season (1974–1975) in the National Basketball Association as a member of the Golden State Warriors. Playing alongside Rick Barry and fellow rookie Jamaal Wilkes in 24 games, he averaged 3.3 points per game and shot 40.3 percent from the field. Kendrick was dropped from the Warriors’ roster in mid season to make room for veteran Bill Bridges. The Warriors went on to win the 1975 NBA Championship and Kendrick won a championship ring in his only NBA season.

=== Sacramento Prospectors ===
Kendrick inked a deal with the newly formed Sacramento Prospectors of the Western Basketball Association after being waived by the Warriors, the Prospectors would finish the season in the middle of the league standings but reach the league finals.

=== Baltimore Claws ===
Kendrick was a member of the Baltimore Claws for the 1975-75 ABA season; however the club folded following the exhibition season.

=== European career ===
After one season in the NBA, Kendrick moved overseas where he spent a decade in several European (France, Belgium and Switzerland) leagues.

== Coaching career ==
=== Purdue ===
After his professional career, he returned to his alma mater and joined the Purdue bench with fellow assistant coaches Steve Lavin and Bruce Weber under head coach Gene Keady. He's well known for recruiting John R. Wooden Award winner and NBA All-Star Glenn Robinson to play at Purdue. He helped Purdue to an overall record of 222–96, which included nine NCAA tournament appearances and one NIT appearance. After ten years on the Purdue bench, another former Boilermaker, Cuonzo Martin, became an assistant a year later.

He was involved in an NCAA investigation for alleged recruiting violations at Purdue in 1995. Purdue ultimately paid $80,000 in fines and Kendrick left Purdue the next season.

=== Gary Steelheads ===
After ten seasons on the Boilermakers bench, he moved on to coach the Gary Steelheads, a first-year franchise team located in Gary, Indiana in the CBA. He drafted two former Boilers in Jaraan Cornell and Chad Austin.

=== Other ===
Frank later ran basketball camps, which consisted of other former Purdue, IBA, and NBA players. In 2002, he was inducted into the Indiana Basketball Hall of Fame. He spent two seasons (2009–10 & 2010–11) as the head coach of his high school alma mater, Indianapolis Arsenal Tech High School. He was employed at Noblesville High School as an instructional assistant until his retirement in 2024.

== Personal life and death ==
Kendrick met his wife, Belgian native Mieke Lambrecht-Kendrick, while he was playing basketball in Europe; she was the sister of one of his teammates. They had three children. His son, Kristof, played college basketball for the Western Michigan Broncos and has served as a coach at the collegiate and high school levels.

Kendrick died in his Indianapolis home on December 18, 2024, at the age of 74.

== Career statistics ==
Legend
GP	Games played	GS	Games started	MPG	Minutes per game
FG%	Field goal percentage	3P%	3-point field goal percentage	FT%	Free throw percentage
RPG	Rebounds per game	APG	Assists per game	SPG	Steals per game
BPG	Blocks per game	PPG	Points per game	**Bold**	Career high

=== NBA ===
==== Regular season ====
Year	Team	GP	MPG	FG%	FT%	RPG	APG	SPG	BPG	PPG
1974–75	Golden State	24	5.0	.403	.818	1.5	.3	.5	.1	3.3
