= Bendix (automobile) =

Defunct American motor vehicle manufacturer

The Bendix Company manufactured the Bendix automobile in Logansport, Indiana from 1908 until 1909.

== See also ==
- Bendix Corporation
