= Mirjam Jacobson =

Dutch artist

- Born: 14 July 1887; Amsterdam, Netherlands
- Died: 8 February 1945 (aged 57); Bergen-Belsen concentration camp, Germany
- Other names: Mirjam Rosa Cohen Bendiks-Jacobson
- Known for: Painting

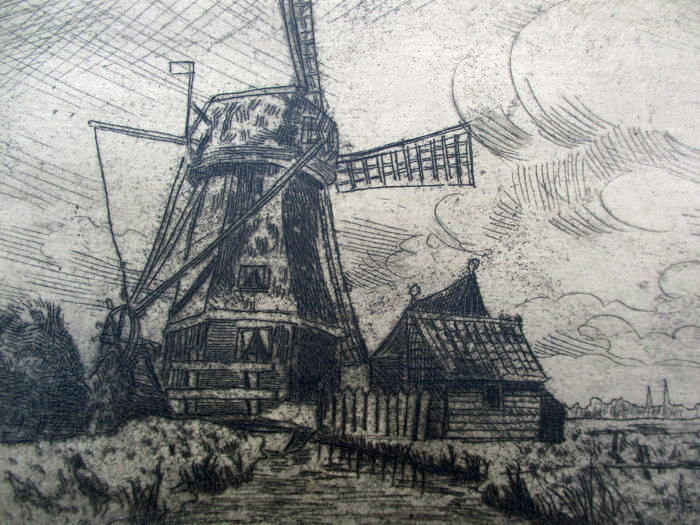
Mill in landscape, 1915

Mirjam Jacobson (14 July 1887 – 8 February 1945) was a Dutch painter.

== Biography ==
Jacobson was born on 14 July 1887 in Amsterdam. She studied at the Rijksschool voor Kunstnijverheid Amsterdam (National School for Arts and Crafts Amsterdam) and the Rijksakademie van beeldende kunsten (State Academy of Fine Arts). Her teachers included Luplau Janssen, Johannes Hendricus Jurres, Simon Maris, Willem Retera, and Hendrik Jan Wolter.

In 1919 she exhibited her work at the Jaarbeurs voor kunstnijverheid (Trade fair for arts and crafts). In 1932 she married Izzac Cohen Bendiks. Jacobson's work was included in the 1939 exhibition and sale Onze Kunst van Heden (Our Art of Today) at the Rijksmuseum in Amsterdam.

Being Jews, Jacobson and her husband were imprisoned at Bergen-Belsen concentration camp. Both she and her husband died there before they were able to immigrate to Honduras. Jacobson died on 8 February 1945 at the age of 57.
