= Studebaker National Museum =

Museum in South Bend, Indiana, United States

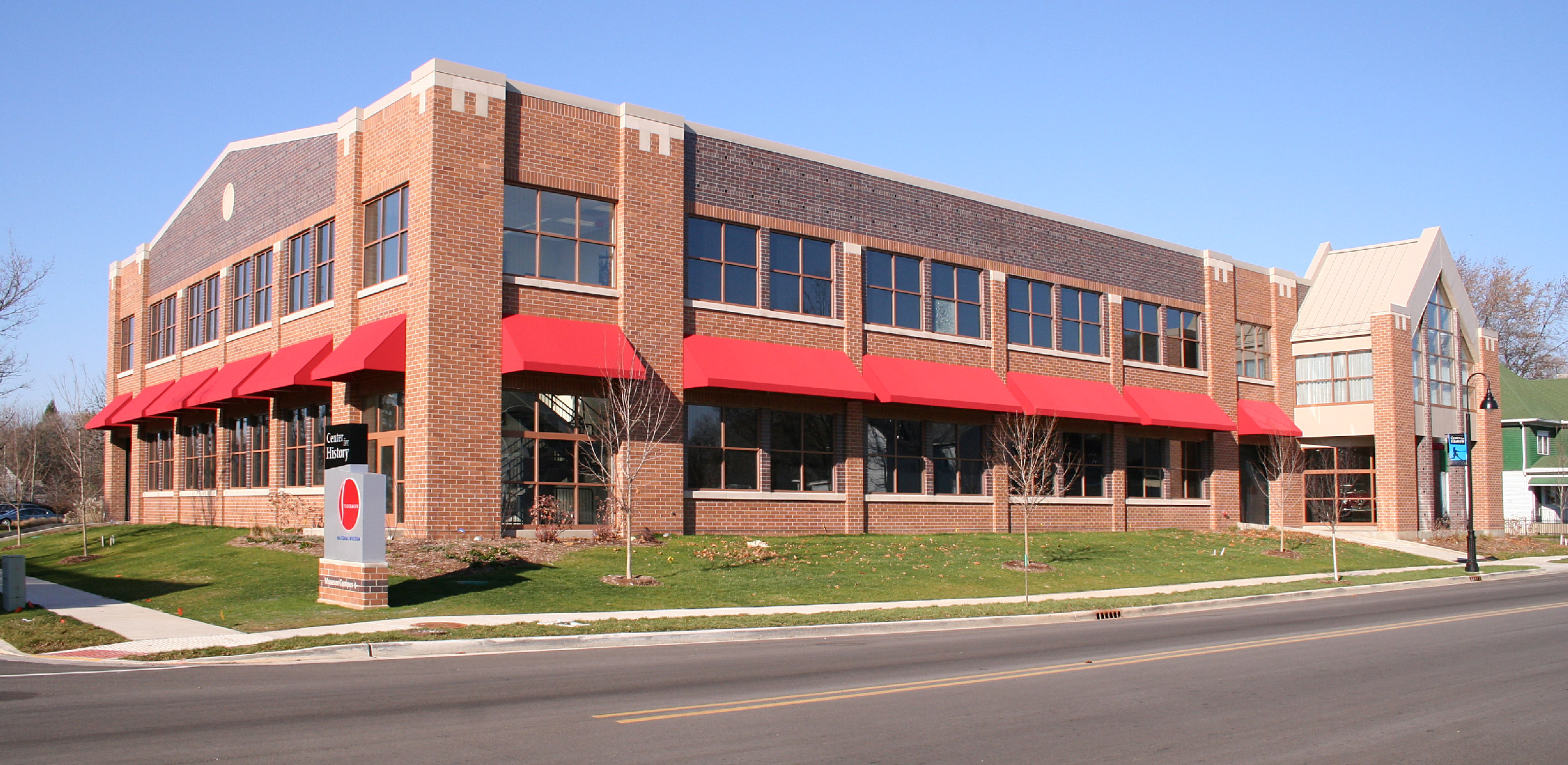
- Location: 201 S. Chapin Street; South Bend, Indiana
- Coordinates: 41.67475°N 86.261913°W
- Type: Automobile
- Website: Official website

The Studebaker National Museum is a museum in South Bend, Indiana, United States, that displays a variety of automobiles, wagons, carriages, and military vehicles related to the Studebaker Corporation and other aspects of American history.

== Layout ==
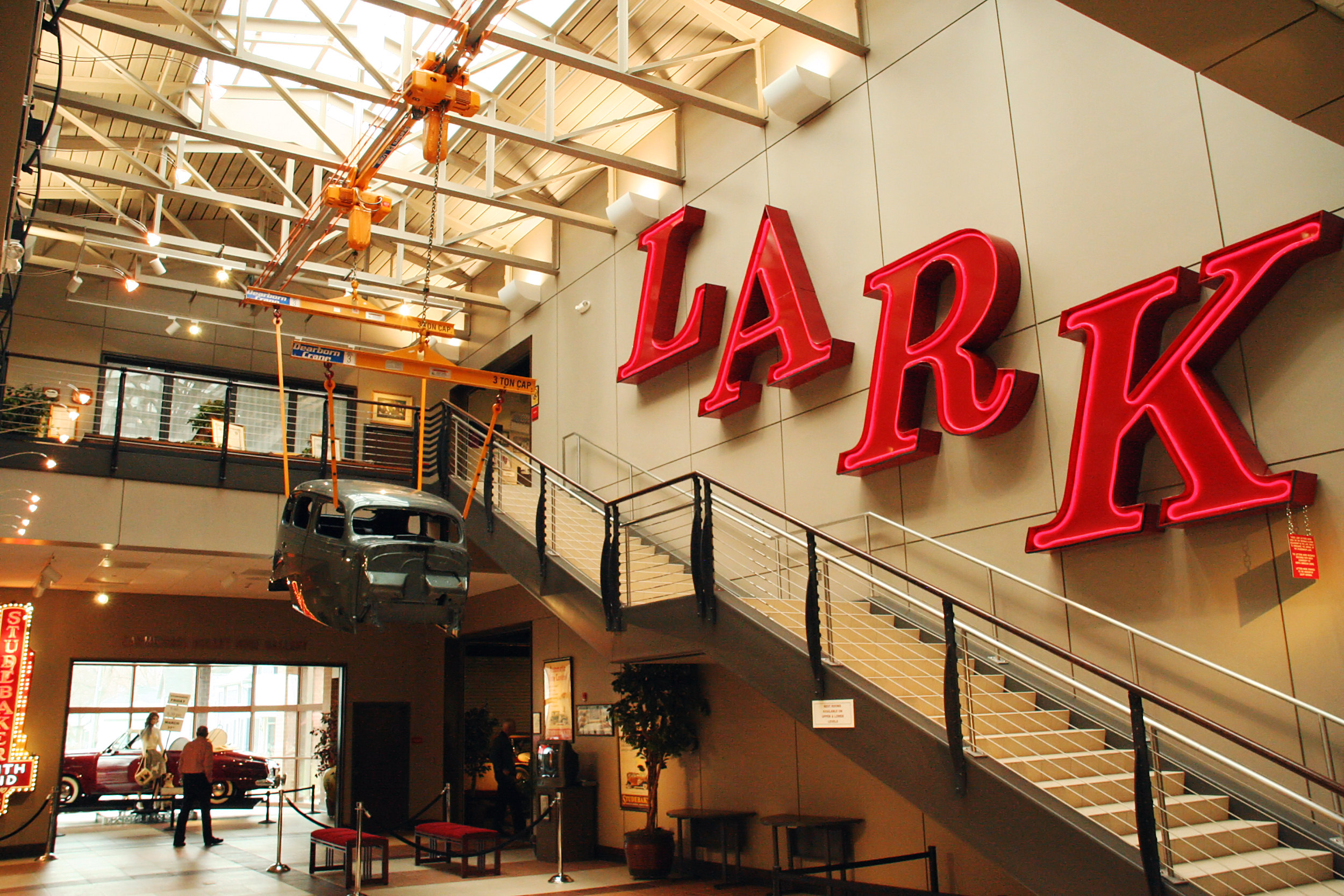
Museum lobby

The Studebaker National Museum is connected to and shares an entrance with The History Museum as part of The Museums at Washington and Chapin. Visitors can purchase a ticket to visit one or both museums.

The Studebaker museum consists of three floors. The main level displays Studebaker history and vehicles from the 1800s to 1934. The upper level displays vehicles from 1934 onward. The lower level displays military vehicles and equipment and additional vehicles in "viewable storage" (stacked on lifts but still viewable). A secondary area on the main level displays family history of the Studebakers and the Olivers, South Bend makers of the Oliver Chilled Plow and other farm equipment.

== The collection ==
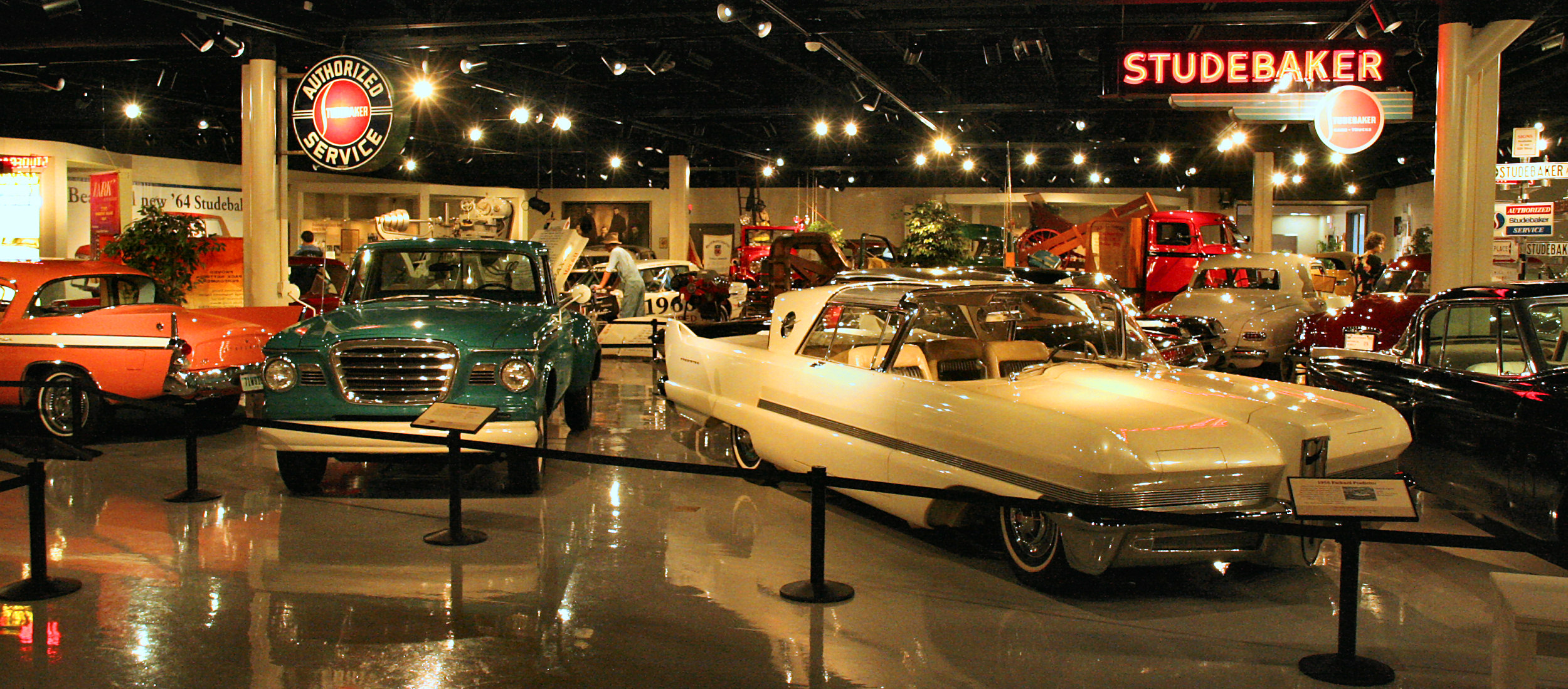
Upper showroom, featuring vehicles from 1935 onward

Most of the museum's collection was part of the historic company's collection, although vehicles continue to be added from time to time. It includes more than 70 vehicles and numerous photos and displays as well as huge archive of photos and documents not on exhibit. Although the collection focuses on the century-long history of the Studebaker corporation and the wagons, cars, trucks, and military vehicles it produced, the collection also includes a variety of other vehicles and products made locally.

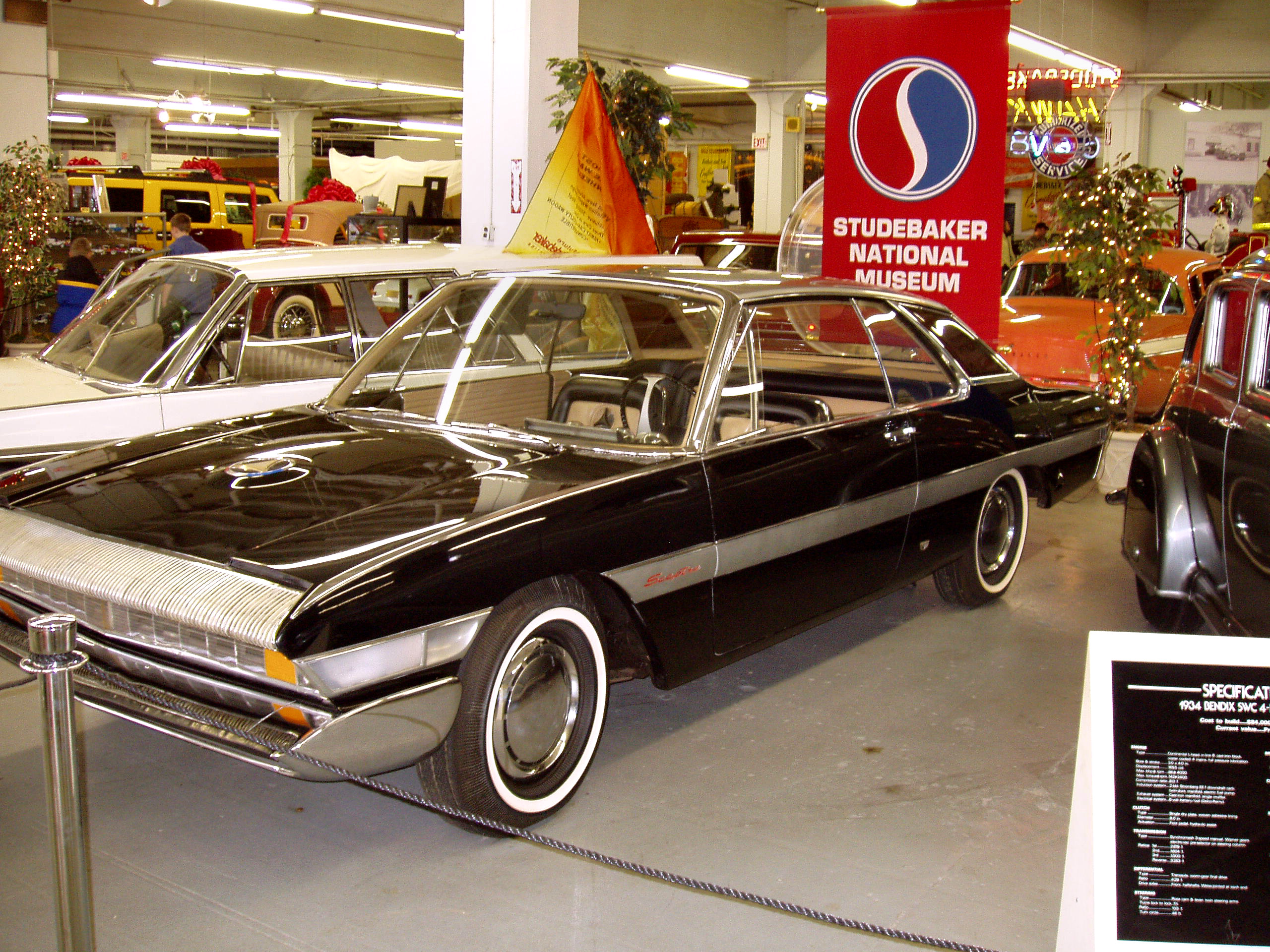
The Studebaker Sceptre concept car from the 1960s

Highlights of the collection include:

- A broad variety of Studebaker production vehicles and concept cars
- Some Packard production and concept cars, reflecting Studebaker's merger with Packard
- The carriage used by President Abraham Lincoln, along with the carriages of several other U.S. presidents and dignitaries
- A Conestoga wagon of the sort used by pioneers to cross the Great Plains
- A 1902 Studebaker Electric
- Studebaker military vehicles built during World War I and World War II
- Several Hummer vehicles including the Humvee, which are manufactured by South Bend-based AM General at its plant in the adjacent city of Mishawaka, Indiana
- A specially-painted Studebaker Champion 2-door sedan used in the filming of The Muppet Movie

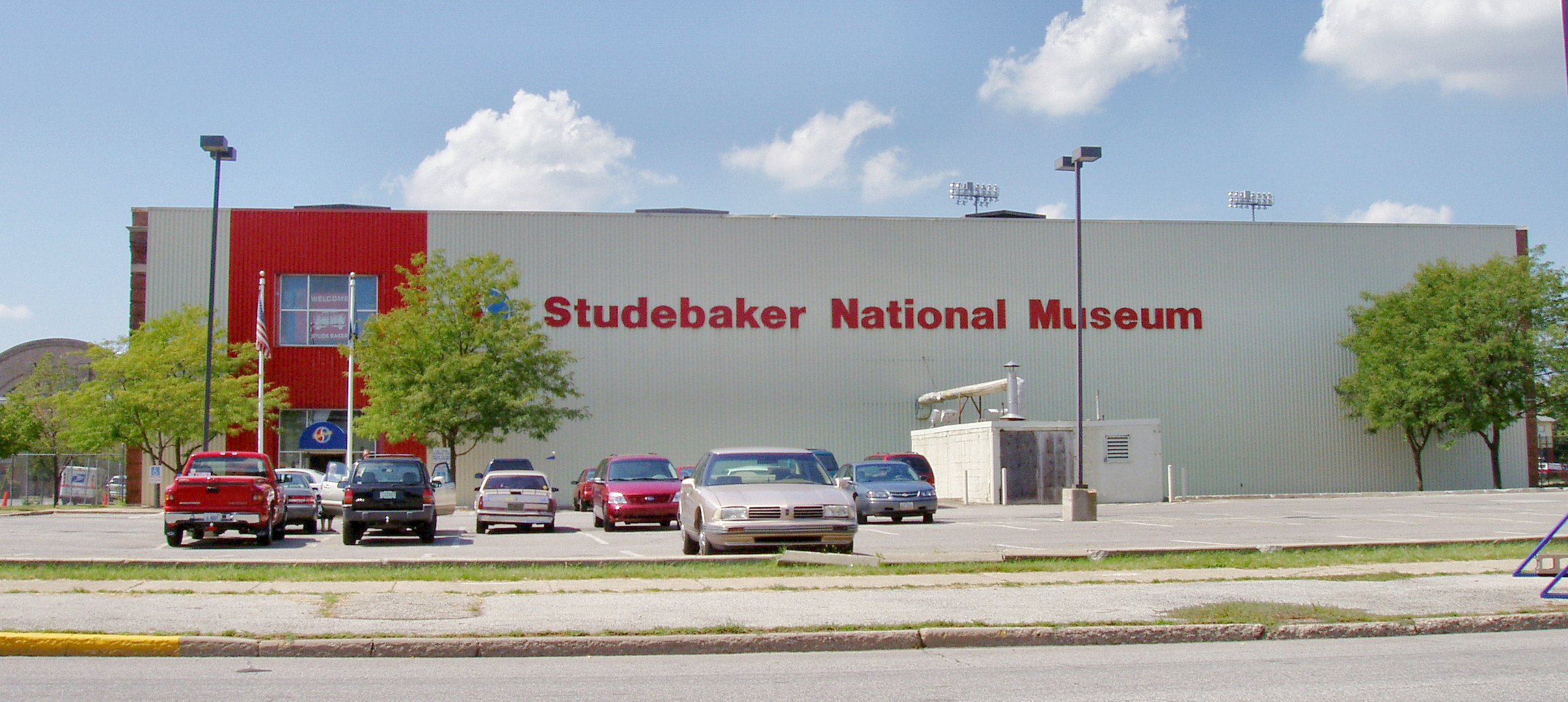
Old Studebaker National Museum on Main Street

== Location ==
In November 2005, the museum opened a new building on Chapin Street, attached to The History Museum. The new building for the museum was designed on the architectural styling of many of the older Studebaker factory buildings in the area.

== See also ==
- America's Packard Museum
- Auburn Cord Duesenberg Automobile Museum
- Bendix SWC, a prototype vehicle in the museum's collection
- List of automobile manufacturers
- List of museums in Indiana
