= The Museums at Washington and Chapin =

Museum campus in South Bend, Indiana, US

Coordinates: 41.674426°N 86.262513°W

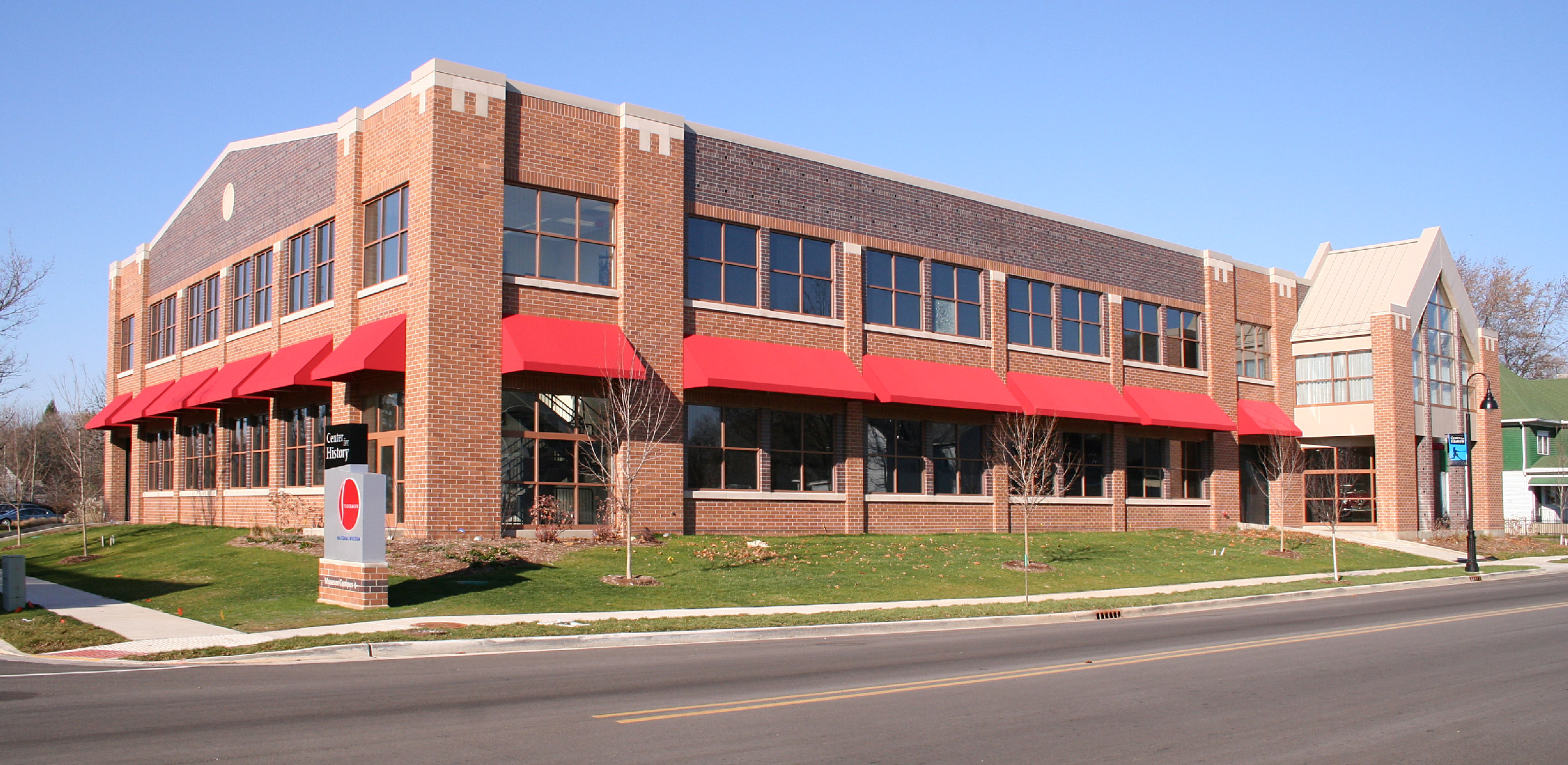
Studebaker National Museum in South Bend, Indiana

The Museums at Washington and Chapin are several museums that share a campus in South Bend, Indiana. The name is derived from the location, at the corner of Washington Street and Chapin Street in South Bend. Both museums have one common entrance off Thomas Street, one block south of Washington Street. The museums currently include the History Museum and Studebaker National Museum.
