= Bendix Corporation =

Defunct American corporation

- Final logo
- Industry: Automotive
- Founded: 1924; 102 years ago
- Founder: Vincent Bendix
- Fate: Buyout; 2002
- Successor: Knorr Bremse
- Headquarters: Avon, Ohio
- Parent: Allied Corporation (1983–1985); AlliedSignal (1985–1999); Honeywell (1999–2008); Knorr Bremse (2008–present)
- Divisions: Bendix Pacific (later Bendix Electrodynamics); Bendix Scintilla; Bendix Field Engineering; Red Bank
- Website: www.bendix.com

Bendix Corporation is an American manufacturing and engineering company founded in 1924 and a subsidiary of Knorr-Bremse since 2002.

At various times in its existence, Bendix has made automotive brake shoes and systems, vacuum tubes, aircraft brakes, aeronautical hydraulics and electric power systems, avionics, aircraft and automobile fuel control systems, radios, televisions and computers. A line of domestic washing machines in the mid-20th century were marketed as Bendix, though they were produced by a partner company that licensed the name. As of 2025, the company focuses on the trucking and automotive industries.

== History ==
=== Early history ===
Classic Bendix wordmark, this variant introduced in the 1950s

Founder and inventor Vincent Bendix filed for a patent for the Bendix drive on May 2, 1914. The drive engages the starter motor with an internal combustion engine and is still used on most automobiles today. Bendix initially began his new corporation in a hotel room in Chicago in 1914 with an agreement with the struggling bicycle brake manufacturing firm, Eclipse Machine Company of Elmira, New York. Bendix granted permission to his invention which was described as "a New York device for the starting of explosive motors." This company made a low cost triple thread screw which could be used in the manufacture of other drive parts.

=== Automotive ===
General Motors purchased a 24% interest in Bendix in 1924, not to operate Bendix but to maintain a direct and continuing contact with developments in aviation, as the engineering techniques of the auto and aircraft were quite similar then. In the 1920s, Bendix owned and controlled many important patents for devices applicable to the auto industry. For example, brakes, carburetors, and starting drives for engines. It acquired Bragg-Kliesrath brakes in the late 1920s. In 1942 Ernest R. Breech became president of Bendix, moving from General Motors. After performing brilliantly for Bendix by introducing GM management philosophies, he attracted the attention of Henry Ford II who persuaded Breech to move to Ford where he finished his career. By 1940 Bendix had sales running c. $40 million. In 1948, General Motors sold its interest in Bendix as GM wanted to focus on its expanding automotive operations. Bendix was formally founded in 1924 in South Bend, Indiana, United States. At first it manufactured brake systems for cars and trucks, supplying General Motors and other automobile manufacturers. Bendix manufactured both hydraulic brake systems and a vacuum booster TreadleVac for its production lines for decades. In 1924 Vincent Bendix had acquired the rights to Henri Perrot's patents for Drum brake/drum and shoe design. (Note: Henri Perrot was a French engineer who patented his designs for drum brakes and shoes. In 1924, after meeting at a European auto show, Vincent Bendix acquired the license to manufacture Perrot's shoe-brake patents.)

In 1956, Bendix introduced Electrojector, a multi-point electronic fuel injection system, which was optional on several 1958 models of automobiles built by Chrysler.

Logo introduced c. 1968

In the 1960s, Bendix automotive brakes blossomed with the introduction of fixed-caliper disc brakes and the "Duo-Servo" system (which became, virtually, a de facto world standard for drum brakes). During the 1960s, Bendix also dabbled in bicycle hardware, producing a reliable, totally self-contained, 2-speed "Kick-Back" planetary rear axle with coaster braking. Also, just as reliable, was the Bendix "Red Band" and "Red Band II" single speed coaster brake hub. followed by the Bendix "70" and Bendix "80" hub. Considered one of the best hubs on the market, at the time.

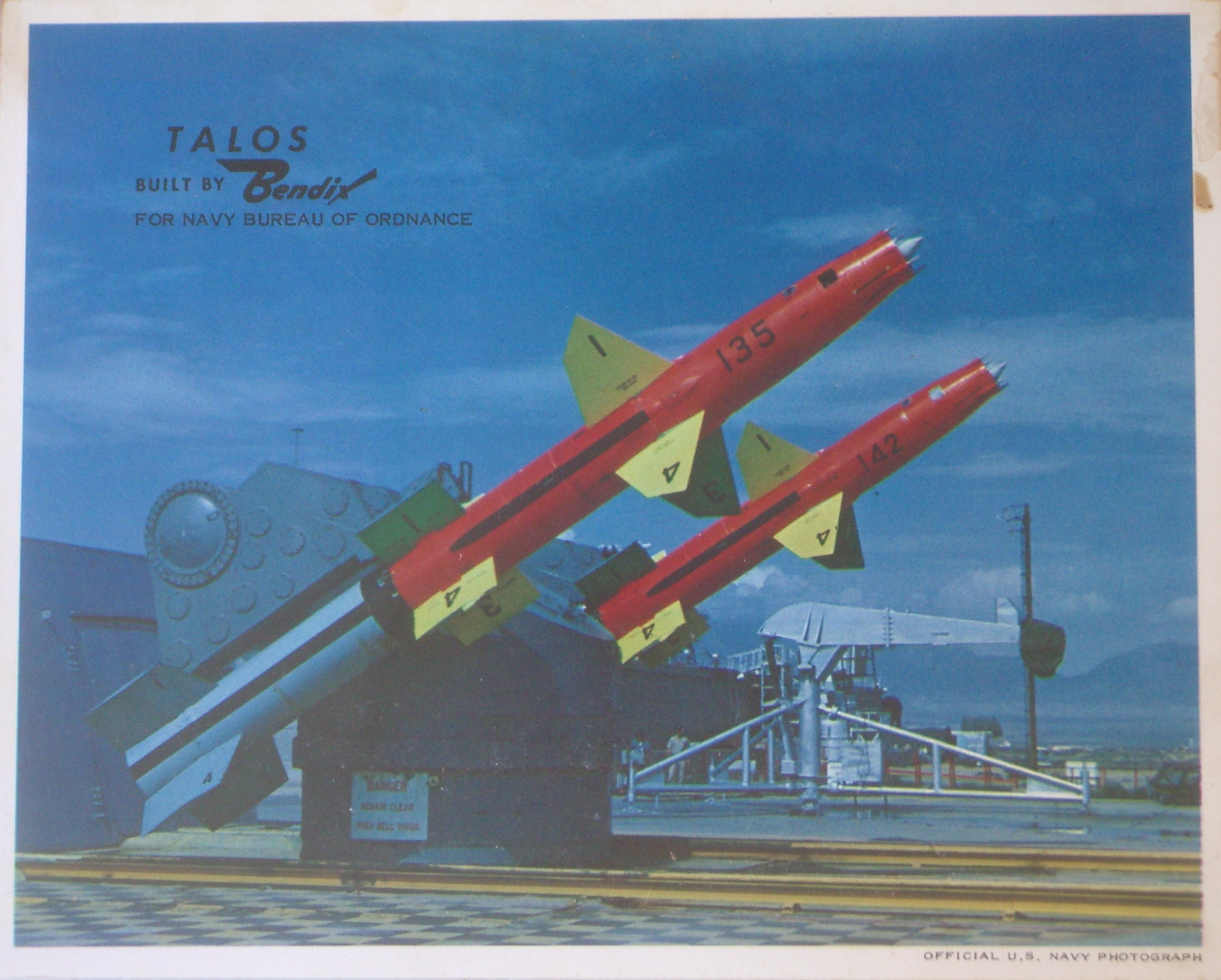
Bendix RIM-8 Talos

Starting in the 1950s or before, Bendix Pacific designed, tested, and manufactured hydraulic components and systems, primarily for the military. In the same facility, avionics and other electronic hardware was designed, manufactured, and documented in technical manuals. Much of this operation was relocated to a new facility in Sylmar, California, where they had a large deep indoor pool for testing sonar. Telemetry components for the RIM-8 Talos surface-to-air missile included transmitters and oscillators in various frequency bands as well as the missile itself were designed and built by Bendix. They built and installed the telemetry system in all the ground stations for the first crewed space flights. For this program, they developed the first cardio tachometer and respiration rate monitor system which enabled a ground-based physician to observe an astronaut's vital signs. MK46 torpedo electronics also came from this facility. Other diverse products included radar detectors in aircraft that identified ground missile tracking and ground missiles launched at aircraft. In the 1960s they produced an anti-lock brake system for military aircraft using established technology similar to Dunlop's earlier Maxaret. The technology is similar to the notched wheel and reluctor now used in cars.

Bendix Scintilla manufactured MIL SPEC electrical connectors of many styles. Criteria were met for hostile and non-hostile environments that provided seals against liquids and gasses.

In 1971, Bendix introduced the world's first true computerized ABS (anti-lock) system on Chrysler's 1971 Imperial. Production continued for several years. Under its later ownership by Honeywell, Bendix continued to manufacture automotive brakes and industrial brakes for a wide variety of industries. In 2014, Honeywell sold the Bendix trademark for automotive brakes in the US, to MAT Holdings.

Many Bendix automotive, truck and industrial brakes sold in the United States used asbestos as late as 1987. Bendix's current parent, Honeywell, continues to deal with numerous lawsuits brought as a result of asbestos-containing Bendix brand brakes.

=== Mass spectrometer ===
Bendix MA-2 Time-of-Flight Mass Spectrometer

A collaboration between Fred McLafferty and Roland Gohlke and William C. Wiley and Daniel B. Harrington of Bendix Aviation in the 1950s led to the combination of gas chromatography and mass spectrometry, and the development of Gas chromatography–mass spectrometry instrumentation. Beginning in the 1960s, Bendix produced scientific instruments such as the Bendix MA-2 Time-of-Flight Mass Spectrometer.

==== Radiological Dosimetry ====
Bendix manufactured Radiological Dosimeters for Civil Defense during the cold war, they also made a Family Radiation measurement kit for home use, which included a CDV-746 dosimeter and a CDV-736 Rate meter, which looked like a dosimeter.

Dosimeters manufactured by Bendix for the Office of Civil Defense included: CDV-138; CDV-730; CDV-736-Ratemeter; CDV-740; CDV-742, the version most commonly used by Civil Defense; and CDV-746.

The Dosimeters measured in Roentgens an hour, which is the standard measurement for ionising radiation.

=== Dashaveyor Automated Guideway Transit ===
In the late 1960s Bendix purchased the rights to the Dashaveyor system – developed for mining and goods movements – in order to use it as the basis for an automated guideway transit (AGT) system, during the heyday of urban transport research in the late 1960s. Often referred to as the Bendix-Dashaveyor in this form, the system used the basic design of the cargo system, but with a larger passenger body running on rubber wheels. Although it was demonstrated at Transpo '72, along with three competitors, only one Dashaveyor system was installed, the 5 km (3.1 mi) long Toronto Zoo Domain Ride which operated from 1976 until its closure in 1994 following an accident due to poor maintenance. Bendix ceased marketing the system by 1975 after it failed to attract interest.

=== Avionics, military and government ===
In 1929 Vincent Bendix branched out into aeronautics and restructured the company as "Bendix Aviation" to reflect the new product lines.

Bendix Aviation was founded as a holding company for the assets of Delco Aviation Corporation, Eclipse Machine Company, Stromberg Carburetor Company, and other aircraft accessory manufacturers.

Bendix supplied aircraft manufacturers with hydraulic systems, for braking and flap activation, and introduced the pressure carburetor. It made a wide variety of electrical and electronic instruments for aircraft.

From 1931, it sponsored the Bendix Trophy, a transcontinental U.S. point-to-point race intended to encourage the development of commercial aircraft.

During and after World War II Bendix made radar equipment of various types.

Bendix ranked 17th among United States corporations in the value of wartime production contracts.

Bendix aviation masks and gauges were modified and tested for use in diving and hyperbaric applications.

In the 1950s, Bendix and its successors managed United States Atomic Energy Commission facilities in Kansas City, Missouri and Albuquerque, New Mexico. These facilities procured non-nuclear components for nuclear weapons.

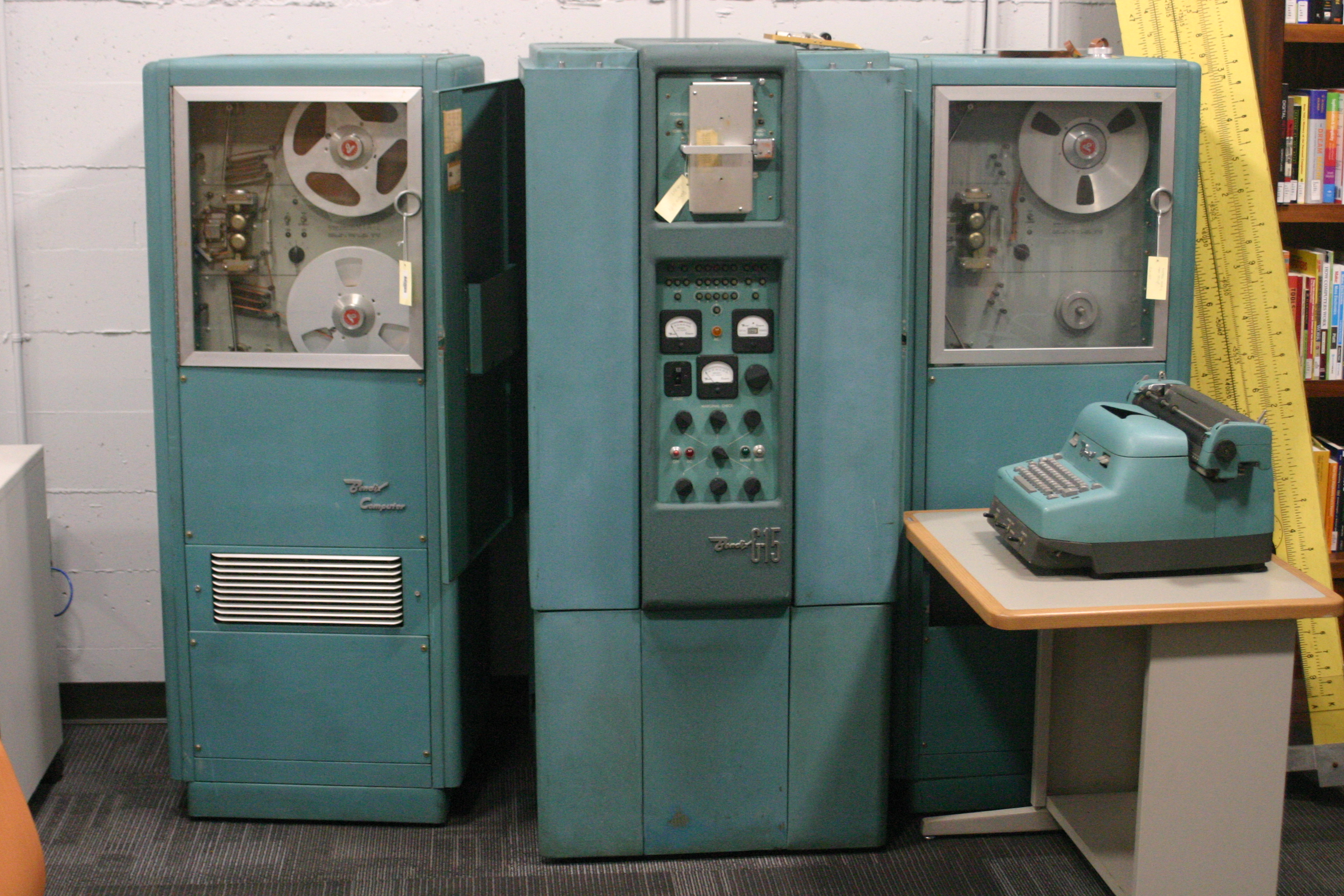
A Bendix G-15 computer

In 1956, the computer division of Bendix Aviation introduced the Bendix G-15, a mini computer which was the size of two tall filing cabinets. The company sold about 400 of these at prices starting at below US$50,000. The Bendix computer division was taken over in 1963 by Control Data Corporation, which continued to support the G-15 for a few years.

The chief designer of the G-15 was Harry Huskey, who had worked with Alan Turing on the ACE in the UK and on the SWAC in the 1950s. Huskey created most of the design while working as a professor at Berkeley and other universities, and also as a consultant.

The company was renamed to Bendix Corporation in 1960. During the 1960s the company made ground and airborne telecommunications systems for NASA. It also built the ST-124-M3 inertial platform used in the Saturn V Instrument Unit which was built by the Navigation and Control Division in Teterboro, New Jersey. It also developed the first automobile fuel injection system in the US. In 1966 NASA selected Bendix Aerospace Systems Division in Ann Arbor, Michigan to design, manufacture, test, and provide operational support for packages of the Apollo Lunar Surface Experiments Package (ALSEP) to fly on the Apollo Program.

In January 1963, the Civil Aeronautics Board (CAB) released a report stating that the "most likely abnormality" to have caused the crash of American Airlines Flight 1 on March 1, 1962, was a short circuit caused by wires in the automatic piloting system that had been damaged in the manufacturing process. CAB inspectors had inspected units at a Teterboro, New Jersey, Bendix Corporation plant and discovered workers using tweezers to bind up bundles of wires, thus damaging them. The Bendix Corporation issued denials, stating that the units underwent 61 inspections during manufacture, in addition to inspections during installation and maintenance work, and insisted that had the insulation on the wires been breached at some point, it would have been detected and the unit replaced.

Marine

During World War II, Bendix was contracted to make engine order telegraphs for the United States Navy.

=== Washing machines and name licensing ===
Although popularly connected to washing machines, the Bendix Corporation itself never manufactured them. In 1936, the company licensed its name to Bendix Home Appliances, another South Bend company founded by Judson Sayre, for a 25% stake in the company.

In 1937, Bendix Home Appliances was the first company to market a domestic automatic washing machine. The 1937 Bendix Home Laundry was a front-loading automatic washer with a glass porthole door, a rotating drum and an electrically driven mechanical timer. The machine was able to autofill, wash, rinse and spin-dry. Initially the lack of any vibration damper meant that the machine had to be secured firmly to the floor. The machine also lacked an internal water heater.

By the time the USA entered World War II, 330,000 units had been sold. Production resumed in 1946 and reached 2,000,000 by 1950.

Bendix Home Appliances was sold to Avco Manufacturing Corporation, which was resold to Philco in 1956.

=== Home electronics ===
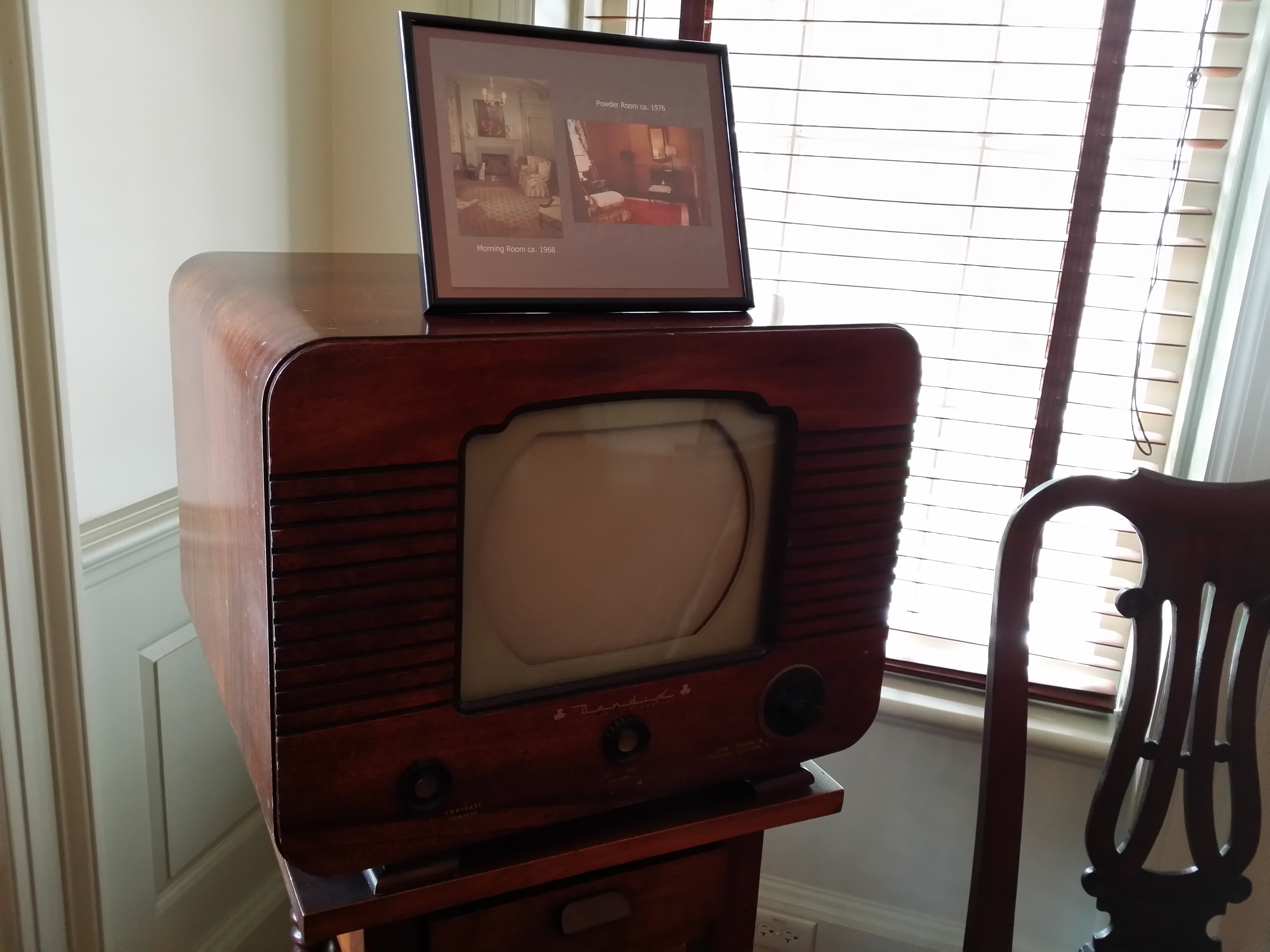
Bendix home television

Bendix first manufactured domestic radios and phonographs for the retail market after WWII as an outgrowth of its production of aircraft radios. In 1948 Bendix started to sell car radios directly to Ford and other auto manufacturers. From 1950 to 1959, Bendix made television sets. Production of radios for the retail trade grew quickly in the 1950s, but stopped quickly in the 1960s when Ford, General Motors and Chrysler started producing their own radios.

=== Recent history ===
Since 2002, Bendix has been a subsidiary of Knorr-Bremse. In February 2020, Bendix announced that it would be moving its headquarters from Elyria, Ohio to Avon, Ohio, with an expected opening date for its new facility of November 2021.

== Mergers ==
In the decades between 1970 and 1990, Bendix went through a series of mergers, sales and changes with partners or buyers including Raytheon, Allied Signal and others. This diluted its corporate identity, though for some years these companies used the Bendix brand for some of their products, such as aircraft flight control systems.

In 1982 under CEO William Agee, Bendix launched a hostile takeover bid of the conglomerate, Martin Marietta. Bendix bought the majority of Martin Marietta shares and in effect owned the company. However, Martin Marietta's management used the short time between ownership and control to sell non-core businesses and launch its own hostile takeover of Bendix – the Pac-Man Defense. Industrial conglomerate United Technologies joined the fray, supporting Martin Marietta in their counter-takeover bid. In the end, Bendix was rescued by Allied Corporation, acting as a white knight. Bendix was acquired by Allied in 1983 for US$85 per share. Allied Corporation, later named AlliedSignal, eventually bought Honeywell and adopted the Honeywell name, and Bendix became a Honeywell brand. Honeywell's Transportation Systems division carried the Bendix line of brake shoes, pads and other vacuum or hydraulic subsystems, and the Bendix/King brand of avionics.

In 2002 Knorr-Bremse took over the commercial vehicle brake business from Honeywell, and Bendix Commercial Vehicle Systems became a subsidiary of Knorr-Bremse.

== In popular culture ==
In the 1960s and 1970s, Archie Comics ran comic-strip ads for Bendix brakes for bicycles featuring Archie Andrews and his friends.

== See also ==
- Bendix drive
- Bendix SWC, a 1934 concept car by the company
- Ernest L. Webster, formed Startomatic Company, which was leased to Bendix
- Michael Blumenthal
- William Agee
- Mary Cunningham
