= Vincent Hugo Bendix =

American inventor and industrialist (1881–1945)

- Born: August 12, 1881; Moline, Illinois
- Died: March 27, 1945 (aged 63); New York City
- Engineering career
- Projects: Bendix Corporation

Vincent Hugo Bendix (August 12, 1881 – March 27, 1945) was an American inventor and industrialist. Vincent Bendix was a pioneer and leader in both the automotive and aviation industries during the 1920s and 1930s.

== Background ==
Vincent Hugo Bendix was born in Moline, Illinois. He was eldest of three children born to Methodist clergyman Jann Bengtsson, a native of Ångermanland, Sweden, and his wife Anna Danielson, also an immigrant from Sweden. While in Moline the family name was changed to "Bendix". They later moved to Chicago, Illinois, and Vincent purchased the Palmer Mansion in July 1928, for $3,000,000, equal to $56,250,000 today.

== Career ==
In 1907 Vincent Bendix founded the Bendix Corporation of Chicago to manufacture automobiles, called Bendix Motor Buggies. After two years and producing 7,000 vehicles the company failed. In 1910 however, Bendix invented and patented the Bendix drive, a gear that could engage an engine at zero rotational speed and then (through the aid of a spring and the higher speed of the running engine) pull back and disengage automatically at higher speed (nominally the engine's running speed). This drive made the electric starter practical for automobile engines and later for engines in aircraft and other motorized vehicles.

In 1922 his father was killed when he was hit by a car with drum brakes; his father's death inspired him to study braking systems. He found a French braking system that he considered to be superior to any braking systems available in the United States's market. In 1923, Bendix founded the Bendix Brake Company, which acquired the rights to French engineer Henri Perrot's patents for brake drum/shoe design a year later.

In 1929, he started the Bendix Aviation Corporation and founded the Transcontinental Bendix Air Race in 1931. In 1942, Bendix started Bendix Helicopters, Inc. Bendix Aviation and Bendix Brake would later be renamed Bendix Corporation.

== Death ==
Bendix died at his home in New York on March 27, 1945, of coronary thrombosis.

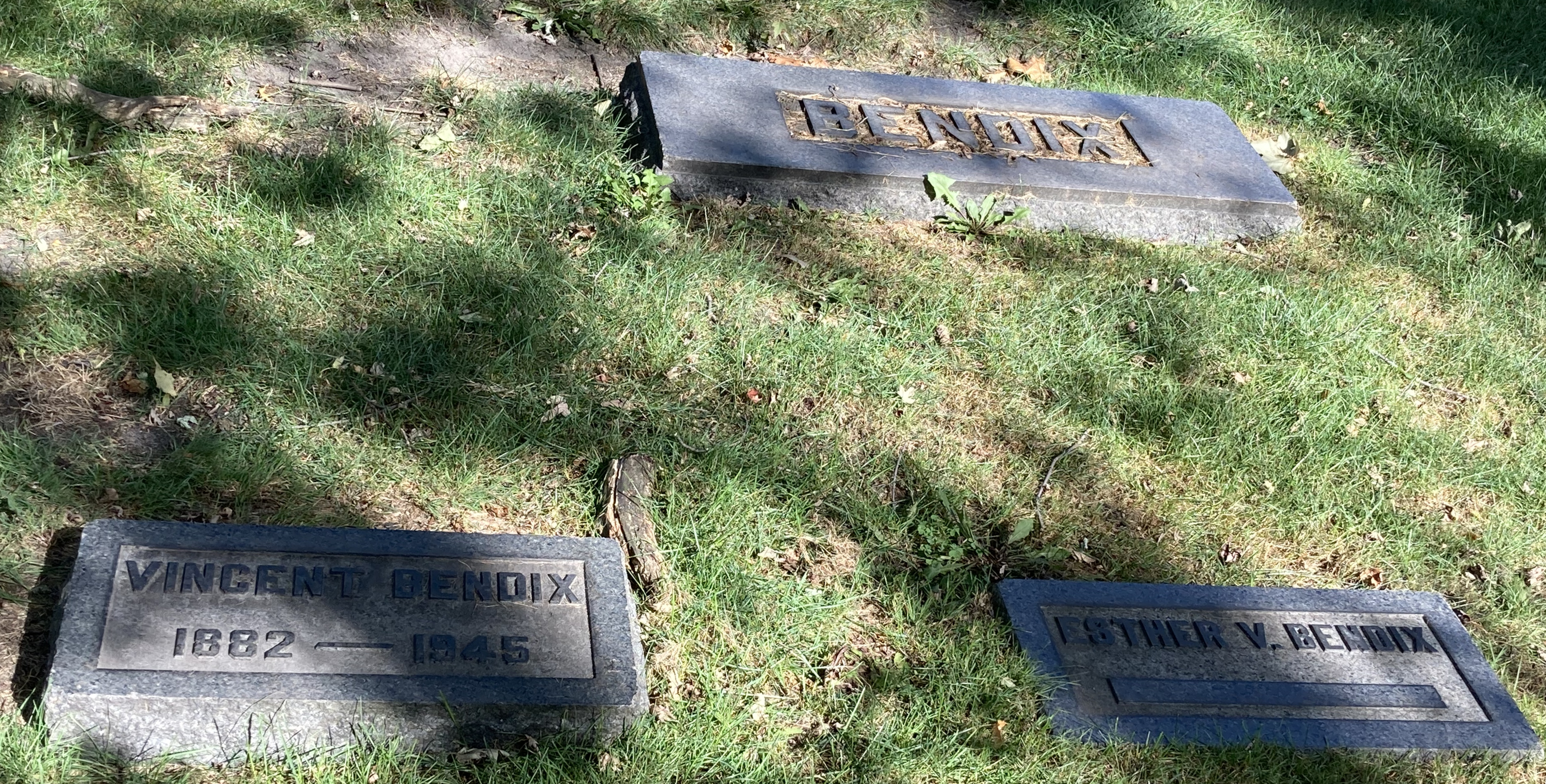
Bendix's grave

== Honors ==
- 1929 - Knight of the Swedish Order of the Polar Star
- 1931 - President of the Society of Automotive Engineers
- 1936 - Knight of the French Legion of Honor
- 1984 - Inducted into the Automotive Hall of Fame
- 1991 - Inducted into the National Aviation Hall of Fame

== See also ==
- Bendix (Automobile)
- Chateau Bendix
- Bendix Trophy
