= Catholic charismatic renewal in Latin America =

The Catholic charismatic renewal is a recent movement in the Catholic Church to re-emphasize the charisms of the Holy Spirit in lay people's everyday lives.

== History ==
The majority of Latin Americans are Catholics. A 2014 poll of Latin Americans indicated that 84% of respondents were raised Catholic, but only 69% self-described as Catholic today; the 15% decline is mostly due to the spread of Pentecostalism in Latin America. Like Pentecostalism, the Catholic charismatic renewal began in the United States. This lay movement began in the 1960s after inspiration of people converting to Pentecostalism and other Protestant denominations. This renewal is to re-emphasize the charisms of the Holy Spirit found in 1 Corinthians in the New Testament of the Bible. Today there are 73 million Catholic charismatics in Latin America.

== Countries ==
The four main pillars of the renewal in Latin America are Brazil, Mexico, Colombia, and the Dominican Republic.

Country	Catholic charismatics (in millions)
Brazil	33.7
Colombia	11.3
Mexico	9.2
Argentina	4.7
Venezuela	3.1
Peru	2.4
Chile	1.6
Ecuador	1.2
Bolivia	0.881
Guatemala	0.864
Haiti	0.782
Dominican Republic	0.752
Puerto Rico	0.522
Honduras	0.503
El Salvador	0.400
Cuba	0.349
Nicaragua	0.216
Uruguay	0.208
Panama	0.198
Costa Rica	0.183
Paraguay	0.099

=== Brazil ===
Brazil's Catholic charismatic renewal began in the 1960s when Jesuit priests Edward Dougherty and Harold Rahm moved from the United States to Brazil. In the early 1970s, while Rahm was calling on the Holy Spirit for the gift of healing people of addictions and other sorts of things, Edward Dougherty was holding retreats. These retreats were called "Experience of Holy Spirit" or "Experience of Prayer." These charismatic retreats emphasized the Holy Spirit. The retreats were then handed over to the lay people of the Catholic Church. In 1979, Edward Dougherty founded Associação do Senhor Jesus (Association of the Lord Jesus) to produce mass media similar to the Pentecostal's. 70,000 member contributors helped fund it. By the 1990s, the movement became popular for university students.

Covenant communities had a huge impact on the spread of Pentecostalism in Brazil. covenant communities were established for people drawn to the movement in strong ways. They were for living in structure with other charismatics looking for encouragement, spiritual direction, and guidance in how to live out their new lives. In 1998 there were about 50 in Brazil. By 2008 that number increased to 300. One of the more popular is the Canção Nova community. They provide a TV and radio station for the movement.

Brazil's charismatic Catholic megachurch is Canção Nova, in Cachoeira Paulista, state of São Paulo. Located between Rio de Janeiro and São Paulo in the Paraiba Valley, this church can hold 100,000 people and has 60,000 people coming weekly. Major preachers at Canção Nova were Father Léo (1961-2007) and the Indian priest and exorcist Rufus Pereira (1933-2012).

Brazil's approach to the Catholic charismatic renewal is to embrace popular culture.

=== Mexico ===
Due to the fact that 88% of the Mexican population is catholic, it was not too difficult for the Catholic charismatic renewal to gain support from the bishops. Lay people soon followed. The First Latin American Charismatic Conference was held in 1973. Prior to this movement in Mexico, the Renovation Movement of Catholic Charismatics in the Holy Spirit had already been spreading. Like Brazil, Mexico had multiple covenant communities which began appearing around 1980. By 2007, there were 27 covenant communities. Like Brazil, the main focus on this movement is the mass evangelization.

=== Colombia ===
In Colombia, the Catholic charismatic renewal began in Minuto de Dios as an effort by activist priests in the early 1970s. These people are the lowest social class and priests let them know they are not forgotten. Colombia's spread is influenced by the incorporation of social justice. This confronts the Pentecostal growth in the country.

=== Dominican Republic ===
The Dominican Republic is regarded as one of the most intensively charismatic Catholic countries. The movement was accepted by lay people and church hierarchy alike with ease.

=== Guatemala ===
The Catholic streams of the charismatic Catholic renewal began in Guatemala with Fr. Francis McNutt who visited in 1970 with Tommy Tyson, Chaplain at ORU, and Ruth Carter Stapleton. About 60 clerics and a few lay persons were impacted, leaving Sor Cecilia a nun with the task of renewal. Later in the home of Catholic Dorothy Asturias, a small band of people gathered. Stella Salazar, half sister to the former President of Guatemala Jorge Serrano Elías, was praying for God to release her son from prison in Chicago. Eugene Harshbarger, and Gladys, from the American Doughnuts and former CIA officer were part of this group. Visits from Enoch Christoffersen of the Full Gospel Business Men's Fellowship added members as more and more people were added. Pepe Garces now owner of NAIS Restaurants was an early adherent, as well as Regina Broll, who would become the President of Women's Aglow International. Tim Rovenstine and Roberta, in their home at Dos Alicias, would hand over their small flock to the group that was formed called Ministerios El Verbo. Dr. Andres Carrodegua who later become a scholar who made a major contribution in Bible research.

== See also ==
- Catholic Church in Brazil
- Catholic Church in Mexico
- Catholic Church in Colombia
- Catholic Church in the Dominican Republic
- Catholic Church in Guatemala

== Sources ==
- Cleary, Edward L. (2011). The Rise of Charismatic Catholicism in Latin America. University Press of Florida. ISBN 978-0-8130-4803-1. Project MUSE book 17834.
