= Jonas Abib =

Brazilian Catholic priest (1936–2022)

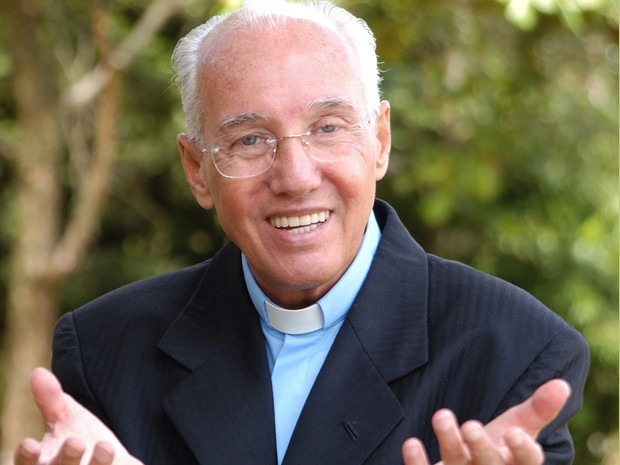

Personal life
- Born: Jonas Abib; 21 December 1936 Elias Fausto, São Paulo, Brazil
- Died: 12 December 2022 (aged 85) Cachoeira Paulista, São Paulo, Brazil
- Website: https://padrejonas.cancaonova.com/

Religious life
- Religion: Roman Catholicism
- Order: SDB
- Ordination: December 8, 1964

Military service
- Rank: Priest

Padre Jonas Abib
- Genres: Contemporary Catholic liturgical music, Contemporary Christian music
- Occupations: singer, composer
- Instrument: Voice
- Years active: 1964–2022

Monsignor Jonas Abib, SDB (21 December 1936 – 12 December 2022) was a Brazilian Catholic priest. He was the founder and leader of the Canção Nova Community.

== Biography ==
Born on 21 December 1936 in Elias Fausto, São Paulo, Brazil, his parents were Sérgio Abib, of Syrian and Lebanese descent, and Josefa Pacheco.

At the age of seven, Abib began his schooling at Colégio Padre Moye (Father Moye Catholic School), run by the Sisters of Providence of Gap. At the age of twelve he studied at the Liceu Coração de Jesus and worked in the graphic arts workshop – binding industry. At the age of thirteen, he was transferred to the San Manuel Gymnasium in Lavrinhas (São Paulo), with the aim of becoming part of the Salesian seminary, where he later left for Pindamonhangaba (SP) to study at the Instituto do Eucharistic Heart, and then to Lorena (SP), to study Philosophy, at the Salesian Institute of Philosophy and Pedagogy.

After completing this stage, he studied theology in São Paulo at the Pio XI Salesian Theological Institute in Alto da Lapa, and was ordained a Salesian priest on 8 December 1964, having chosen the following motto: "Made all for all". Abib soon after being ordained as a priest began in São Paulo to work with young people teaching at the Faculty of Sciences and Letters of Lorena/SP and promoting meetings and retreats, mainly in the Paraíba Valley region of São Paulo. In 1971, Jonas Abib had an experience of prayer in a retreat promoted by the Catholic Charismatic Renewal, marking his life and ministry, becoming, from the beginning, one of the main leaders of this ecclesial movement. His life is also marked by music. He is a composer of several songs and is also a Catholic singer, being one of the pioneers of popular Catholic music in Brazil.

== Canção Nova Community ==
In 1978, Jonas Abib, together with a small group of young people, founded the Canção Nova Community, whose mission is to train new men for a new world, to bring personal experience to the person of Jesus Christ through events and by the media.

In 1980, Canção Nova began to work in the media with Radio Canção Nova, in the municipality of Cachoeira Paulista, acting in the old frequency of Radio Bandeirantes, now with power that covers the whole of Brazil.

From 1989, Comunidade Canção Nova began to work with a TV retransmitter, Canção Nova by TVE of Rio de Janeiro.

In the year of 2002, Jonas Abib celebrated the 25 years of the Canção Nova. Also in 2002, he met with Pope John Paul II.

In 2004, along with the Canção Nova Community, inaugurated the Center of Evangelization Don João Hipólito de Moraes, a place for more than 80 thousand people.

Jonas Abib was president of the John Paul II Foundation and member of the Catholic Charismatic Renewal Council of Brazil, as well as other functions.

The Community Canção Nova, as well as several New Communities that have arisen in the last 30 years in Brazil (Shalom Catholic Community, Sweet Mother Community of God Catholic Community Message, MEL Community of God, Catholic Community Gospa Mira, Holy Family Alliance Community CASF), New Communities in Brazil), is a Private Association of Faithful, of generally mixed origin, ie, men, women and / or religious.

In 2008, the Canção Nova Community received the Pontifical Recognition of the Church, which attests that it is, from then on, an International Association of Faithfuls.

== Monsignor and Chorbishop ==
On 9 October 2007, Jonas Abib received the title of Monsignor. Pope Benedict XVI gave the priest the title given to priests who stand out for relevant services rendered to the Church and to the faithful in their dioceses. The official request was made by the Bishop of the Diocese of Lorena, Bishop Benedito Beni dos Santos. The investiture ceremony took place eight days later, at Cachoeira Paulista, at the Canção Nova headquarters.

In the same year, he received the title of Corepiscopo of the Maronite Church, granted by the Maronite Eparchy of Brazil through Bishop Edgard Madi. Such a title is the highest honor a Maronite presbyter can receive under the bishop and is awarded directly by the Maronite Patriarch. The investiture ceremony took place on Monsignor Jonas' birthday, in the Maronite Cathedral of Our Lady of Lebanon. The paternal family of Monsignor Jonas was originally linked to the Maronite Church, since his grandfather was deacon of the same one when in Lebanon. It is so much that Jonas Abib had to ask permission to the Maronite Eparchy of Brazil to become deacon and presbyter by the Roman Rite.

Monsignor Jonas Abib died around 22:00 BRT on 12 December 2022 (Feast of Our Lady of Guadalupe), nine days before his 86th birthday.

== "Jonas Abib Case", freedom of expression and religious proselytism ==
Jonas Abib is the author of the book Sim, Sim, Não, Não! – Reflexos de Cura e Libertação, which reached its 85th edition in 2007. In 2008, a controversy began about the allegedly prejudiced content with which Jonas Abib referred to other religions, such as spiritism, in addition to those religions of African origin, such as Umbanda and Candomblé. In 2008, the Bahia state court ordered the collection of the publication in the State. The Bahian prosecutor, in turn, accused Abib of inciting religious discrimination (article 20, Law 7,716 / 1989).

The case reached the Federal Supreme Court, which ruled in respect of it in 2016, in the case of an Ordinary Appeal in Habeas Corpus. The rapporteur of the case, Minister Luiz Edson Fachin, first explained that "the discriminatory criminal discourse only materializes after three indispensable steps have been taken: one of cognitive character, attesting to the inequality between groups and or individuals, another of value bias, in which is based on a supposed relationship of superiority between them and, finally, a third, in which the agent, from the previous stages, assumes legitimate the domination, exploitation, enslavement, elimination, suppression or reduction of fundamental rights of the different that comprises inferior".

In the case in point, Minister Fachin understood that Abib "by means of publication in a book, incites the Catholic community to undertake a religious rescue aimed at the salvation of adherents of spiritualism, in an attitude which, despite the fact that, does without any sign of violence, domination, exploitation, enslavement, elimination, suppression or reduction of fundamental rights. " Accordingly, the Court decided that the crime of incitement to religious discrimination should not be defined, since the conduct, "although intolerant, pedantic and arrogant", as the minister rapporteur of the case qualified, is part of the religious proselytism of the Catholic religion, quality "essential to the exercise, in its entirety, of freedom of religious expression".

Except for Minister Luiz Fux, the other ministers of the First Chamber voted with the rapporteur, extinguishing the criminal action.

== Discography ==
Participation in COMEP records

- 1976 – Canções para Orar no Espírito 2
- 1976 – Canções Latino Americanas para Orar no Espírito
- 1977 – Ele Vive

Solo Career

- 1977 – O Amor Vencerá (Gravadora COMEP)
- 1984 – Anuncia-Me
- 1985 – Quem Dera...
- 1986 – Vem Louvar
- 1987 – Vem Louvar II - Tu És a Vida
- 1987 – Vem Louvar III – Queremos Deus
- 1988 – Vem Louvar IV - 10 Anos de Canção Nova
- 1989 – Vem Louvar V - Entregue Seu Caminho a Deus
- 1991 – Anuncia-Me 91
- 1991 – Canção Nova: Volume 1
- 1992 – Canção Nova: Volume 2
- 1992 – Rio de Água Viva
- 1993 – Eu e Minha Casa Serviremos ao Senhor
- 1997 – Como É Linda a Nossa Família
- 2001 – Não Dá Mais Pra Voltar [Versions]
- 2004 – Só Pra Você [Live]
- 2008 – Como É Linda a Nossa Família (ao vivo) [CD and DVD]

Collecting

- 1994 – Collection: As 20 +
- 1994 – 20 Sucessos
- 1998 – O Vento Sopra Onde Quer
- 2000 – Maria, Mãe da Canção Nova
