= Guido Schaffer =

Brazilian Venerable

Venerable Guido Vidal França Schäffer
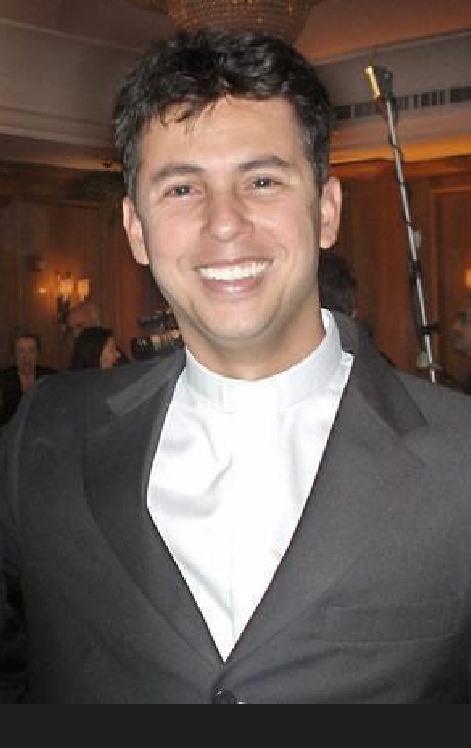
- Born: 22 May 1974; Volta Redonda, Rio de Janeiro, Brazil
- Died: 1 May 2009 (aged 34); Rio de Janeiro, Brazil

Guido Vidal França Schäffer (22 May 1974 – 1 May 2009) was a Brazilian doctor, surfer, and seminarian. He died in a surfing accident in 2009.

The Archdiocese of São Sebastião do Rio de Janeiro has begun his beatification process and he was proclaimed venerable in 2023.

== Biography ==
Guido Vidal França Schäffer was the son of Guido Manoel Vidal Schäffer and Maria Nazareth França Schäffer. His father is a doctor, and his mother is a member of the Good Shepherd Community (Catholic Charismatic Renewal). Schäffer grew up in Copacabana, Rio de Janeiro, where he learned to enjoy the beach and surfing. He studied medicine at the Technical Educational Foundation Souza Marques (1993-1998). After his residency, he joined the medical staff of the 4th and 20th Wards of the Holy House of Mercy in Rio. He decided to become a general practitioner, a specialty that allowed him to assess the patient as a whole. During his academic education he was also dedicated to care for HIV patients at the Evandro Chagas Hospital (Oswaldo Cruz Foundation).

Known for his knowledge of the Bible and for the importance he gave to the sacraments and the use of the charisms of the Holy Spirit, Schäffer founded several prayer groups and held many lectures. In 1999, during a retreat at the Canção Nova (New Song) Community, Schäffer heard a priest preaching the following passage: "Never turn your face from the poor, and God will never turn his from you" (Tobit 4:7). At that moment, he reflected how many times he had looked away from the poor. He asked God for forgiveness and said, "Jesus, help me take care of the poor." A week later he met the sisters of the congregation founded by Mother Teresa (the Missionaries of Charity), whose mission is the care for the "poorest of the poor." He realized that God had heard his request and was giving him the direction he wanted for his medicine. He volunteered his medical services to the Missionaries of Charity and started to meet the homeless on the streets. He organized the volunteers, inviting other doctors from the Holy House of Mercy and the youth of the prayer group.

When reading the book The Brother of Assisi by Ignacio Larrañaga, he felt called to the priesthood. Schäffer began the first years of preparation at the Institute of Philosophy and Theology, located at the Monastery of Saint Benedict in Rio de Janeiro. As an external student, he combined seminary classes along with his volunteer medical work and his lay preaching ministry. In 2008, he officially joined the Saint Joseph Seminary (Rio de Janeiro) in order to finish his studies.

== Death ==
On May 1, 2009, at thirty-four years old, Schäffer died while surfing at the Barra da Tijuca beach, Rio de Janeiro. The incident was the result of a neck injury which led to unconsciousness and drowning.

His body was recovered, and a funeral Mass was held the next day in the parish of Our Lady of Copacabana, presided over by the Archbishop of Rio de Janeiro - now Cardinal - Orani João Tempesta. The church was full with an estimated 1,700 people in attendance, from all locations and social classes, along with approximately seventy priests and three bishops. Before the coffin was closed at the end of the Mass, Tempesta said: "This church so full shows me how this young man was a good shepherd, and as I know of his desire to become a priest, I will put the stole in his hands." The bishop then approached Schäffer’s body and placed the stole in hands for burial.

== Beatification process ==
After his death, reports of cures soon began to appear, attributed to the intercession of the young doctor, seminarian and surfer. On January 17, 2015, with permission from the Vatican, the process of beatification and canonization was initiated by Archbishop Tempesta. At this stage, Schäffer received the title “Servant of God”. He was later declared Venerable by the pope on May 20th, 2023.
