= Eduardo Dougherty =

Brazilian Jesuit

Fr. Edward ("Eduardo") John Dougherty, SJ is an American-Brazilian Jesuit priest, educator, communicator and religious leader of the Catholic Charismatic Renewal movement in Brazil.

Father Dougherty was born on January 29, 1941, in New Orleans, Louisiana, United States. He was ordained in 1965 and first came to Brazil in 1966. He did his theological studies in Toronto, Ontario, Canada. Before returning to Brazil, in 1969, he underwent his baptism of the Holy Spirit at Michigan, becoming a charismatic. Establishing himself in Campinas, a city in the state of São Paulo, he began to collaborate with another American Jesuit priest of the charismatic movement, Father Harold Rahm (the creator of a successful program to recover drug addicts through a method which he called Demanding Love ("Amor Exigente" in Portuguese language).

In 1980, Father Dougherty founded the Associação Senhor Jesus (Lord Jesus Association) a not-for-profit educational and religious association located in Valinhos, São Paulo (very near to Campinas), which began by selling and distributing religious publications, music records, etc., and soon afterwards, the TV program "Anunciamos o Senhor" (We Announce the Lord), involving a national chain of three TV stations covering 60% of Brazilian territory.

In 1990, he started his own satellite TV channel called "TV Século 21" (21st century TV), supported by a foundation with the same name. With excellent and extensive facilities in an area of more than 24,000 m²., the TV enjoys one of the most extensive (and free of charge) retransmission networks of educational television channels in Latin America.

Father Dougherty has a keen entrepreneurial and marketing approach to his ministry and has studied business administration in the USA.

== Quote ==
I believe that the Catholic Church needs to enchant its clients. Using a marketing concept, we have the best possible product, that is, God; the best possible price, which is free; and a very extensive worldwide distribution network; but we still have to make a lot of noise. Our product must be an experience of God."
