= Emiliano Tardif =

Canadian priest (1928–1999)

Servant of God Emiliano Tardif MSC
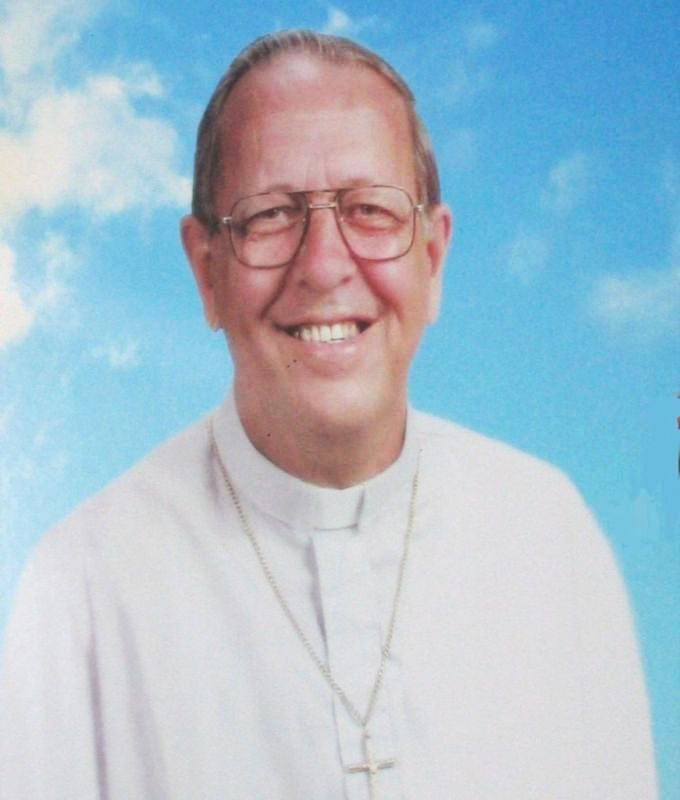
- Born: 6 June 1928; St-Zacharie, Quebec
- Died: 8 June 1999; San Antonio de Arredondo, Córdoba Province, Argentina

Emiliano Tardif (June 6, 1928, in the City of St-Zacharie, Quebec, Canada – June 8, 1999) was a missionary who is in the process of being beatified.

== Life ==
Emiliano Tardif was born on June 6, 1928, in Quebec, Canada. He became a member of the Missionaries of the Sacred Heart on September 8, 1949. Tardif was ordained a priest on June 24, 1955, and was sent to the Dominican Republic soon after his ordination. There, he became one of the founders of the Missionary Seminary of San José de las Matas. From 1966 to 1973, he was the superior of his order.

In 1973 he fell ill with tuberculosis, which meant he had to return to Canada for treatment and rest. During this time he was prayed over by some lay people from a charismatic prayer group, who happened to be visiting the hospital. Through this he became involved in the Catholic Charismatic Renewal and discovered that he had been given a powerful gift of healing by God. From 1997, he was succeeded by the Indian priest Rufus Pereira as a member of the International Catholic Charismatic Council for Renewal.

Tardif was well known for his missionary work around the globe, and for what he said to be a healing power from God. He died on June 8, 1999, from heart complications on San Antonio de Arredondo, Córdoba Province, Argentina. Cardinal Nicolas de Jesús Lopez Rodríguez announced on June 11, 2007, that the Roman Catholic Church had initiated the beatification process for Tardif.
