= Rufus Pereira =

Roman Catholic priest (1933–2012)

Rufus Pereira (5 May 1933 – 2 May 2012) was a Roman Catholic priest, author of publications on spiritual life, Doctor of theology and exorcist.

== Biography ==
Born in Bandra, a suburb of Mumbai, India, he was ordained a priest in 1956. He received his doctorate in Biblical Theology from the Pontifical Gregorian University in Rome. After returning to India, he worked as a high school principal in Mumbai.

Since 1972 he was associated with the Catholic Movement for Renewal in the Holy Spirit. He published a monthly magazine devoted to the Catholic charismatic renewal in India.

From 1994 he was the vice-president of the International Association of Exorcists, serving under president Gabriele Amorth.

In 1995 he initiated the International Association for the Ministry of Deliverance.

From 1997, as the successor of Emiliano Tardif, he was a member of the International Catholic Charismatic Council for Renewal.

=== Preaching career ===
The priest travelled to Europe and Brazil many times, preaching retreats. In the latter, he was a frequent preacher at Canção Nova, in the municipality of Cachoeira Paulista, state of São Paulo.

He was known for his phrase:

"The devil hates me!"

=== Death ===
He died in London in 2012 due to a heart stroke.

== Books ==
In Portuguese

- Who is Jesus?
- Jesus: a Master within reach of all
- The key to healing
- Steps to healing
- I bring you improvement and healing
