= Anjos de Resgate =

Brazilian Catholic band

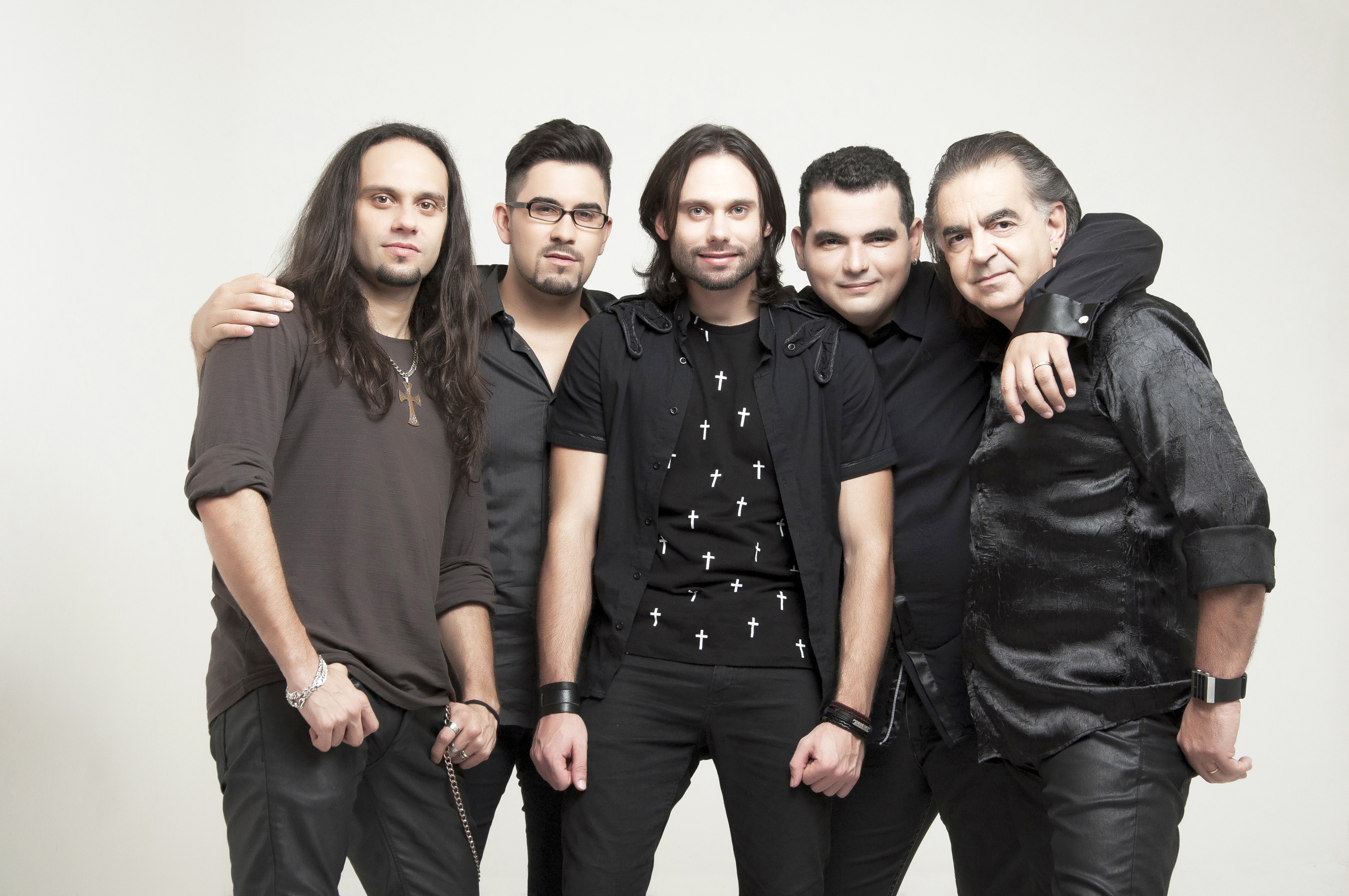

Background information
- Origin: Brazil
- Genre: Contemporary Catholic liturgical music
- Years active: 2000–present
- Labels: Codimuc; Som Livre; Universal Music
- Members: Eraldo Matos; Marcelo Duarte; Demian Tiguez; Diego Tiguez
- Past members: Marcos Pavan; Alexandre Guidini "Xandão"; Dalvimar Gallo; Francis Botene; Maikon Máximo
- Website: http://www.anjosderesgate.com.br/

Anjos de Resgate is a Brazilian Catholic band formed in 2000 and composed by Eraldo Mattos, Marcelo Duarte, Demian Tiguez and Diego Tiguez.

== History ==
The band was born after the release of Deus Está no Ar, during the RCC congress in 2000, which originated from Dalvimar Gallo's desire to help the work "Angels of Rescue" (recovery of dependents) and enter in the Catholic music segment, since he had left the band Dallas Country, to concretize the CD Dalvimar called his friend Marcos Pavan to collaborate in the recordings.

His initial training was designed by Dalvimar and had: Alexandre Guidini (Xandão) on drums, Dalvimar Gallo (guitar), Eraldo Mattos (bass) and Marcelo Duarte (keyboards).

Among his successes are songs " Anjos de Resgate", which was also recorded by Father Marcelo Rossi, and "Amigos da Fé", with the special participation of singer Dunga, then a member of the Canção Nova Community. The album reached 125,000 copies sold, winning the platinum album in 2005.

In 2002, the group released the CD Luz das Nações, which further leveraged the band's success, with the songs "Estou Aqui", "Mais do que Amigos", "Tua Família" (with the participation of the Catholic singer Adriana Arydes) and "Tenha Sede de Deus." The disc surpassed the mark of 50 thousand copies sold, being awarded with the gold disc. This album was also released in playback.

The third album of the band, Um Só Coração, came in 2003 and emplaced the successes "Majestosa Eucaristia", "O Céu Está Orando por Ti" and "Maria e o Anjo", that had special participation of Celina Borges. The album repeated the sales success of the previous one, arriving at the gold disc.

In 2005, the group released their first DVD and CD, titled + Que Amigos, reminiscent of great successes of the band, counting on special participation of Dunga, Marcos Pavan, Dayana Cardoso and Adriana. This was the last work of the group with the drummer "Xandão" who had been replaced by Maikon Maximo.

In 2006, the unseen album Seja Luz was released, which reached the market already with a historical mark of 50,000 copies sold. Outstanding songs such as: Por Amor, Seja Luz, Pão dos Anjos among others.

2008 was a year of transformation, after a restructuring of the label Codimuc, of which the Anjos de Resgate was part from the beginning and also by a series of absences in the shows by health problems the founder Dalvimar Gallo leaves the band to follow solo career. Among the new members are Francis Botene (ex-Ceremonya) (keyboard) and Demian Tiguez (ex-Ceremonya) (guitar).

In 2009 the band, already with the new line-up, released their second DVD titled Ao Vivo in Brasilia. For better distribution and dissemination this DVD had a partnership between Codimuc and the new song.

In 2010 the band began a commemorative tour at 10 years of career.

In 2011 Anjos de Resgate released the commemorative album Anjos de Resgate 10 Years with a selection of their greatest hits, released by the label Som Livre.

In the year of 2012 the band released the CD Marcados por Amor, arriving at the 8th disc that brings 12 new tracks and consolidates the new musical dynamics, already approved by the public in the shows by Brazil. The album also has special participation of the group Cantores de Deus.

In 2014, Francis Botene (keyboardist), receives a proposal so dreamed of study in the USA, then leaves the band. From there began the search for a new keyboardist for the band. It was when Diego Tiguez (Demian's brother) recorded an audio singing "TUA FAMÍLIA", the members of the band liked it, so he was invited to sing this song in Francis's farewell show. After that tests were made, and he became the lead singer of the band and Marcelo returned to his original keyboardist position.

In 2015 the band celebrated the 15 years with the tour Anjos 15 anos and launched the CD Inspiração, with tracks that are already successful throughout the country. That same year, in November, they recorded the DVD GRP, in Varzea Paulista in the space Ark of the Alliance, where they sang the songs of the new album and the greatest successes of the 15 years of his career. The DVD release is scheduled for 20 July 2016, when the band will turn 16 years of career. On 2 March 2018, Maikon Máximo published an official note on his Facebook profile stating that he was, not willingly, leaving the band Anjos de Resgate.

== Current members ==
- Marcelo Duarte: voice, vocals, classical guitar, base guitar and keyboards
- Demian Tiguez: solo guitar, classical guitar, voice and vocals
- Eraldo Mattos: bass, classical guitar, voice and vocals
- Diego Tiguez: voice, vocals and classical guitar

=== Former members ===
- Dalvimar Gallo: voice, guitar and classical guitar
- Alexandre Guidini (Xandão): drums and percussion
- Francis Botene: keyboard, classical guitar, sax, harmonica, voice and vocals
- Maikon Máximo: drums, percussion, voice and vocals

== Discography ==
CDs

- 2000 – Deus Está no Ar
- 2002 – Luz das Nações
- 2003 – Um Só Coração
- 2004 – + Q Amigos: Ao Vivo
- 2006 – Seja Luz
- 2009 – Ao Vivo em Brasília
- 2011 – Anjos de Resgate - 10 Anos
- 2012 – Marcados Pelo Amor
- 2015 – Inspiração

DVDs

- 2004 – + Q Amigos: Ao Vivo
- 2009 – Ao Vivo em Brasília
- 2017 – GRP – Graça Redenção e paz
