= Padre Léo =

Brazilian priest and Servant of God

Servant of God Léo Tarcísio Gonçalves Pereira SCJ
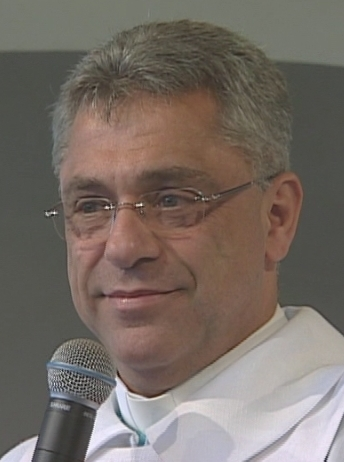
- Padre Léo in 2004
- Church: Roman Catholic
- Archdiocese: Florianópolis

Orders
- Ordination: 8 December 1990
- Rank: Priest

Personal details
- Born: 9 October 1961 Delfim Moreira, Minas Gerais
- Died: 4 January 2007 (aged 45) São Paulo, São Paulo
- Buried: Bethânia Community, São João Batista, Santa Catarina
- Occupation: Founder of the Bethânia Community

Léo Tarcísio Gonçalves Pereira, SCJ (9 October 1961 – 4 January 2007), better known as "Padre Léo", was a Brazilian priest of the Congregation of Priests of the Sacred Heart of Jesus (Dehonian). Currently he is a Servant of God.

== Biography ==
He was son of Joaquim Mendes and Maria Nazaré. He joined the Catholic Charismatic Renewal (CCR) in 1983 and, on October 12, 1995, founded the Bethânia Community, which today has more than thirty members and five houses throughout Brazil, which aim to welcome and offer treatment to drug addicts, alcoholics and HIV carriers, as well as abandoned minors.

In 2002 he was given the title of honorific citizen of Curitiba, state of Paraná.

Father Léo not only was a priest and preacher, but also a singer, composer, presenter and writer. He had a Conservative mind - a preeminent Catholic voice among Conservatism in Brazil - but an informal communication style.

=== Cancer ===
In April 2006, Father Léo began a cancer treatment he had and, even weakened, was present at the event "Hosana Brasil 2006", of the Canção Nova Community, in December, much downplayed by the treatment.

=== Death ===
On January 4, 2007, he died at the Hospital das Clínicas in São Paulo, victim of a generalized infection as a result of an incurable cancer in the lymphatic system (lymphoma).

== Beatification process ==
In 2020, his beatification process was opened.
