= Jesuit Outreach, Segundo Barrio =

Christian organization

Coordinates: 31°45′13.82″N 106°29′10.3″W

- Established: 1892; 134 years ago
- Type: Sacred Heart Church outreach
- Purpose: Outreach to Hispanics
- Headquarters: Sacred Heart Church
- Location(s): El Segundo Barrio El Paso, Texas, USA
- Region served: El Paso & Juarez
- Official language: Spanish & English
- Parent organization: Jesuits Central & Southern
- Affiliations: Jesuit, Catholic
- Endowment: $1,500,000 (for education)
- Website: SHsocial

Jesuit Outreach, Segundo Barrio began with the founding of Sacred Heart parish in 1892. It has provided numerous programs initiated by Jesuits to respond to the human needs of Hispanics in the border area of El Paso, Texas, and Juarez, Mexico.

== History ==
=== Beginnings ===
In the 1870s Jesuits from Naples, Italy, came to the El Paso area and established a string of more than 30 parishes, laying the foundation for the diocese of El Paso. Jesuit Anthony J. Schuler was consecrated the first Bishop in 1915. In 1892 these Jesuits had founded Sacred Heart parish in El Paso to respond to the needs of the people up and down the Rio Grande Valley and on both sides of the border. An introduction to the people who characterize El Segundo Barrio was carried on PBS in 2010. El Segundo has been described as one of Texas' most famous barrios.

=== Modern Era ===
One Jesuit whose outreach to the neighborhood is remembered is Harold Rahm, a pastoral associate at Sacred Heart Parish from 1952 to 1964. In 1952 he formed Guadalupano Club and the following year obtained and outfitted Our Lady's Youth Center for sports and other activities. He also opened Camp Juan Diego for a get-away. All these redirected the energies of gang members and at-risk youth in the area. He also founded an employment office, a thrift store, a credit union, and homes for young people. The La Fe Family Health Center, was originally named Father Rahm Clinic in honor of his work.

Rahm used his bicycle to deliver breakfast to the elderly, and found that with a bicycle he could get closer to where the youth hang out. In El Paso he began his lifelong work of addressing drug addiction, before his religious superiors sent him to Brazil.

In 2015, at 96, Rahm came back from Brazil to receive the first ever "Segundo Barrio Person of the Year" award.

Richard Thomas, who took over from Rahm, remained in the job from 1964 until his death in 2006. He continued the work with the students at Public High School Bowie.

In 1996 Rafael Garcia expanded the educational offerings of the parish under the name Pastoral Social Center, providing 46 semester hours of multi-leveled educational opportunities a week for over 250 adults. Courses include Adult Basic Education (ABE), high school equivalency (GED) in both English and Spanish, and English as a second language (ESL), along with computer literacy and professional courses.

=== Twenty-first century ===
The Pastoral Social Center, with Ron Gonzales at the helm, continues its outreach, along with other programs.

Wall art is popular in El Paso, and the front of the center has "one of the most famous murals in all of Texas," telling the story of El Paso, including Rahm on his bicycle. This "Sacred Heart Mural" is also described as one of the "5 Best Street Art Locations in El Segundo Barrio", an area of "astounding street art".
