= Raniero Cantalamessa =

Italian Catholic cardinal and priest

His Eminence Raniero Cantalamessa OFM Cap
- Cardinal, Preacher Emeritus of the Papal Household
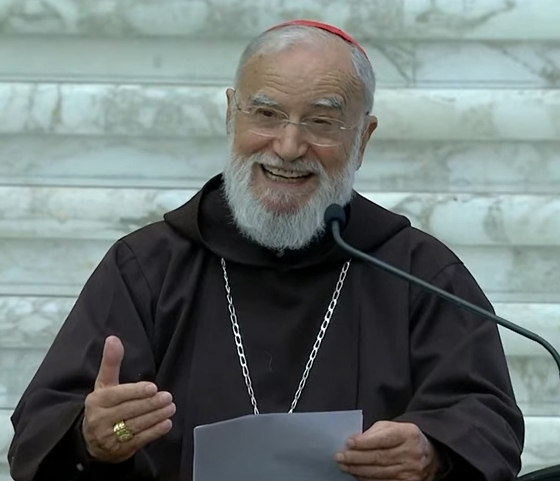
- Cantalamessa in 2020
- Church: Latin Church
- Appointed: 23 June 1980
- Term ended: 9 November 2024
- Predecessor: Alfredo Marchesi
- Successor: Roberto Pasolini
- Other post: Cardinal-Deacon of Sant'Apollinare alle Terme Neroniane-Alessandrine (since 2020)

Orders
- Ordination: 19 October 1958 by Gaetano Malchiodi
- Created cardinal: 28 November 2020 by Pope Francis
- Rank: Cardinal-Deacon

Personal details
- Born: 22 July 1934 (age 92) Colli del Tronto, Ascoli Piceno, Italy
- Denomination: Roman Catholic
- Education: University of Fribourg; Università Cattolica del Sacro Cuore
- Motto: Veni Creator Spiritus (Come, Creator Spirit)
- Coat of arms

Raniero Cantalamessa OFM Cap (born 22 July 1934) is an Italian Catholic cardinal, Capuchin priest, and theologian. He served as the Preacher to the Papal Household from 1980 until 2024, under Popes John Paul II, Benedict XVI, and Francis. A proponent of the Catholic charismatic renewal, he was elevated to the cardinalate by Pope Francis in 2020.

== Biography ==
=== Early life and education ===
Raniero Cantalamessa was born in Colli del Tronto, Italy, on 22 July 1934. He was ordained as a priest in the Franciscan Capuchin order in 1958. He holds doctoral degrees in theology and classical literature. He formerly served as a professor of ancient Christian history and the director of the Department of Religious Sciences at the Università Cattolica del Sacro Cuore in Milan, resigning in 1979. Cantalamessa also served as a member of the International Theological Commission from 1975 until 1981.

In his 1988 book The Mystery of Christmas, Cantalamessa wrote that the Church must reassess its identity based upon its Jewish roots: "Quite a few in the Jewish religion have started to acknowledge Jesus as 'the glory of Israel.' They openly acknowledge Jesus as the Messiah and call themselves 'Messianic Jews.' ... These help us to overcome certain gloomy prospects of ours, making us realize that the great original schism afflicting the Church and impoverishing it is not so much the schism between East and West or between Catholics and Protestants, as the more radical one between the Church and Israel." He then wrote: "We are not saying this in a spirit of proselytism but in a spirit of conversion and obedience to the Word of God because it is certain that the rejoining of Israel with the Church will involve a rearrangement in the Church; it will mean a conversion on both sides. It will also be a rejoining of the Church with Israel."

=== Preacher to the Papal Household ===
Cantalamessa was appointed the Preacher to the Papal Household by Pope John Paul II in 1980 and was confirmed in this position by Popes Benedict XVI and Francis. In this capacity, he provided meditations to the Pope and other high-ranking officials each Friday during Lent and Advent, and was "the only person allowed to preach to the Pope."

In December 2006, Cantalamessa urged Pope Benedict XVI in an Advent sermon to declare a day of fasting and penitence in response to child sex crimes by clergy in the Roman Catholic Church. There was no reported reaction from the pope.

In 2010, Cantalamessa's sermon during Good Friday prayers in St Peter's Basilica was reported as implying that the coverage of alleged child abuse and cover-ups within the Roman Catholic Church was evidence of anti-Catholicism and that this coverage bore similarities to the "more shameful aspects of anti-Semitism". Cantalamessa responded that he was reading directly from a letter received earlier in the week from a Jewish friend who was expressing his contempt for what he considered a blatant media assault on the pope. Vatican spokesman Federico Lombardi issued a statement saying that Cantalamessa was not speaking as a Vatican official and that Cantalamessa's comparison could "lead to misunderstandings and is not an official position of the Catholic Church".

On 29 March 2013, in a Good Friday homily delivered in St Peter's Basilica, Cantalamessa advocated clearing away "the residue of past ceremonials, laws and disputes, now only debris". He then referred to Francis of Assisi as a model for the creative destruction of ecclesial traditions:

As happens with certain old buildings, over the centuries, to adapt to the needs of the moment, they become filled with partitions, staircases, rooms and closets. The time comes when we realize that all these adjustments no longer meet the current needs, but rather are an obstacle, so we must have the courage to knock them down and return the building to the simplicity and linearity of its origins. This was the mission that was received one day by a man who prayed before the Crucifix of San Damiano: "Go, Francis, and repair my Church".

Cantalamessa, a frequent speaker, is a member of the Catholic Delegation for Dialogue with the Pentecostal Churches. He hosted a weekly program on Radiotelevisione Italiana.

At the suggestion of Pope Francis, Cantalamessa led a retreat for the bishops of the US at Mundelein Seminary from 2 to 8 January 2019 to seek spiritual guidance in addressing the clerical sex abuse crisis in the US Catholic Church.

=== Cardinal ===
On 25 October 2020, Pope Francis announced he would raise him to the rank of cardinal at a consistory scheduled for 28 November 2020. On his request, the pope granted Cantalamessa dispensation from the requirement that he be consecrated a bishop. At that consistory, Pope Francis made him Cardinal-Deacon of Sant'Apollinare alle Terme Neroniane-Alessandrine. Aged more than 80 at the time of his elevation to the cardinalate, Cantalamessa was never eligible to serve as a cardinal elector.

His office of Preacher to the Pontifical Household ceased on 9 November 2024, when his successor was appointed. He planned in retirement to live at the Hermitage of Merciful Love in Cittaducale and serve on occasion as chaplain to a community of Poor Clare nuns there.

=== Conclaves ===
Two papal conclaves were held while Cantalamessa was serving as preacher to the papal household, and both times he was invited to deliver one of the two public exhortations that begin a conclave, in 2005 and 2013. Although he had retired as papal preacher, he was once again invited to give the second of the two exhortations at the 2025 conclave, which immediately precedes the casting of the first ballots in the conclave. Reportedly, Cantalamessa's remarks lasted for over an hour, delaying the start of the first ballot; at one point, Cardinal Pietro Parolin, presiding as the senior cardinal bishop who is an elector, asked the other cardinal electors present if they wanted to postpone the first vote until the next morning, but the vote proceeded that day without postponement.

== Film ==
Cantalamessa is the primary subject of the award-winning documentary The Preacher to the Popes: Raniero Cantalamessa from CMAX Media and Awakening the Domestic Church. The film premiered in December 2021 in Norfolk, VA. As of 14 January 2022, the documentary has won 8 awards in 12 different festivals.

== Writings ==
Cantalamessa is the author of numerous books on theological and spiritual topics. A selection follows:

- Glorify God in Your Bodies: Our Call to Horizontal Holiness (1986)
- The Mystery of Christmas: A Commentary on the Magnificat (1988)
- Jesus Christ, the Holy One of God (1991)
- The Holy Spirit, Soul of Evangelization (1992)
- The Eucharist, Our Sanctification (1993)
- Easter in the Early Church (1993)
- The Mystery of Easter (1993)
- The Holy Spirit in the Life of Jesus, The Mystery of Christ's Baptism (1994)
- The Mystery of God's Word (1994)
- Virginity (1995)
- The Power of the Cross (1996)
- The Ascent to Mount Sinai (1996)
- Poverty (1997)
- Life in Christ: A Spiritual Commentary on the Letter to the Romans (1997)
- The Mystery of Pentecost (2002)
- Spiritual Healing (2003)
- Come, Creator Spirit: Meditations on the Veni Creator (2003)
- Loving the Church (2005)
- Sober Intoxication of the Spirit (2005)
- This Is My Body (2005)
- Contemplating the Trinity (2007)
- Beatitudes: Eight Steps to Happiness (2009)
- The Gaze of Mercy: A Commentary on Divine and Human Mercy (2015)
- The Power of the Cross: Good Friday Sermons from the Papal Preacher (2023)
- Faith, Hope, and Charity (2024)

== See also ==
- Cardinals created by Francis
- Prefecture of the Papal Household

Catholic Church titles
Preceded by Alfredo Marchesi	Preacher for the Papal Household; 23 June 1980 – 9 November 2024	Succeeded by Roberto Pasolini
Preceded by Jean-Louis Tauran	Cardinal-Deacon of Sant'Apollinare alle Terme Neroniane-Alessandrine; 28 November 2020 – present	Incumbent
