= Roberto Pasolini =

Capuchin friar and papal preacher

The Reverend Fra' Roberto Pasolini OFM Cap
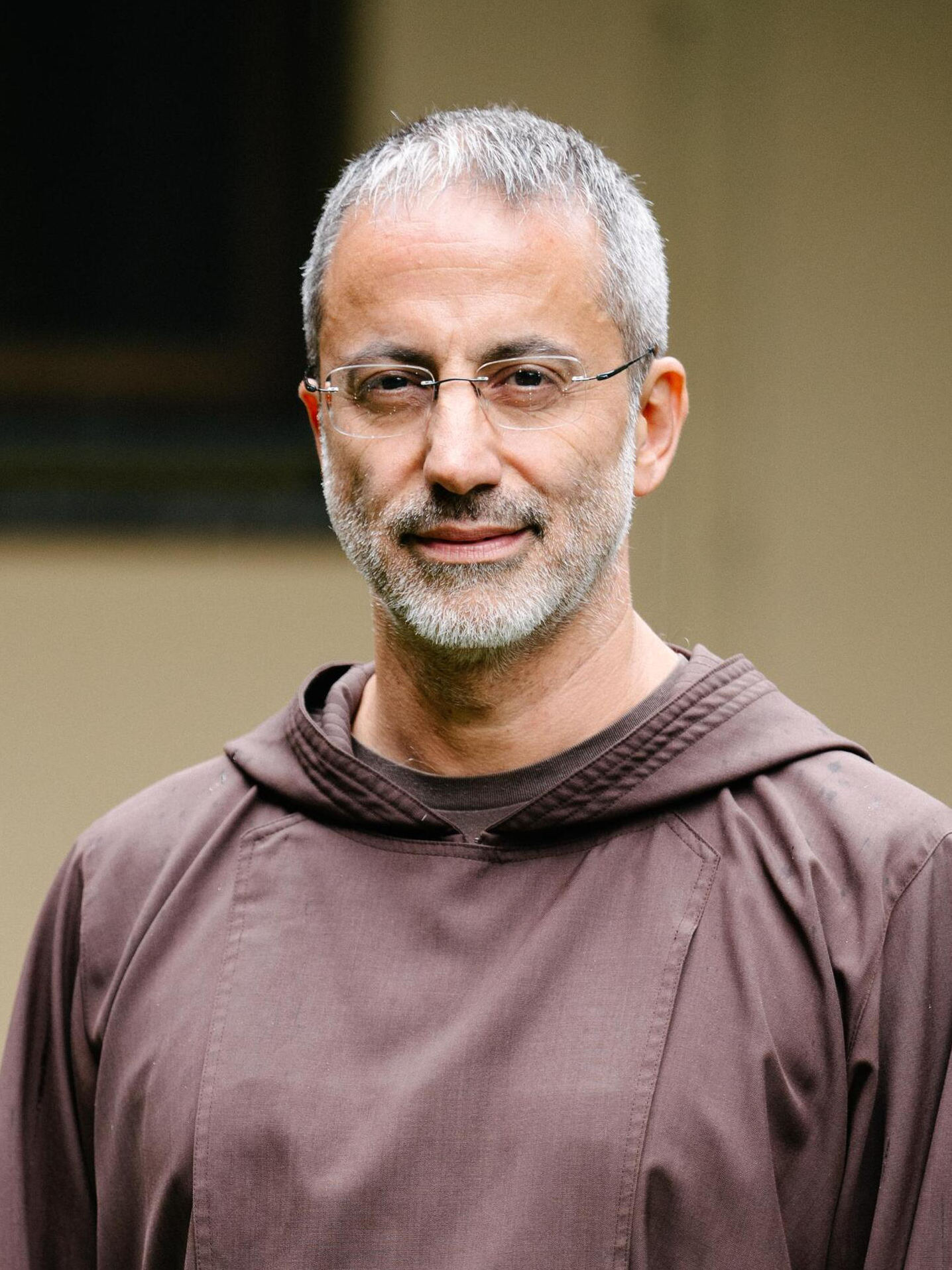
- Pasolini in 2024

Preacher of the Papal Household
- Incumbent
- Assumed office 9 November 2024
- Preceded by: Raniero Cantalamessa

Personal life
- Born: 5 November 1971 (age 54) Milan, Italy

Religious life
- Religion: Christianity
- Denomination: Catholic Church
- Order: Order of Friars Minor Capuchin
- Profession: 7 September 2002 (perpetual vows)
- Ordination: 23 September 2006 (priest)

Roberto Pasolini (born 5 November 1971) is an Italian Catholic priest, Capuchin friar and biblical scholar who has served as the preacher of the Papal Household since 2024 and a member of the Dicastery for Communication since 2026.

Prior to entering religious life, Pasolini studied information science and artificial intelligence. After experiencing a return to the Catholic faith in his early twenties, he joined the Capuchin Franciscans in 1997 and was ordained a priest in 2006. He earned a doctorate in biblical theology and has taught on scripture, biblical exegesis, and biblical languages at several theological institutions in Italy. In 2024, Pope Francis appointed Pasolini to succeed Cardinal Raniero Cantalamessa as the preacher of the Papal Household.

== Biography ==
Pasolini was born on 5 November 1971 in Milan, Italy. At age 15 or 16, he distanced himself from his local Catholic church but did not become an atheist. He studied information science at the University of Milan, graduating in 1996; he wrote his thesis on artificial intelligence. At age 22, he returned to his faith after reading a copy of the Gospel of Matthew that was included as a free supplement with a newspaper he found while traveling on the subway.

He entered the Order of Friars Minor Capuchin in 1997 and took his perpetual vows on 7 September 2002. He was ordained a priest on 23 September 2006. He earned a doctorate in biblical theology from the Pontifical Gregorian University in 2016.

He has taught biblical languages, sacred scripture, and biblical exegesis at a number of institutions in Italy: the Pontifical Urbaniana University (2013–2017), the Laurentianum Interprovincial Theological Studium of the Friars Minor Capuchin in Milan and Venice (2016–2023), and the Theological University of Northern Italy (from 2020).

On 9 November 2024, Pope Francis appointed him as Preacher of the Papal Household, succeeding Cardinal Raniero Cantalamessa. The position has been held by a member of the Order of Friars Minor Capuchin since 1743. Pasolini has also been a member of the Dicastery for Communication since 9 April 2026.

Catholic Church titles
Preceded by Raniero Cantalamessa	Preacher for the Papal Household; 2024 – present	Incumbent
