= Harold Rahm =

American Roman Catholic priest

Harold "Haroldo" Rahm S.J.
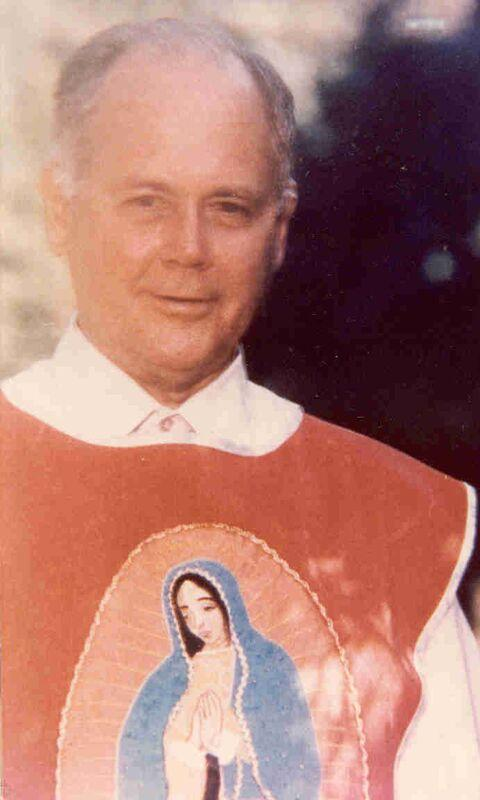
- Born: February 22, 1919; Tyler, Texas
- Died: November 30, 2019 (aged 100)
- Citizenship: Dual, USA/Brazil
- Education: BA (Language), STL (Theology)
- Alma mater: Loyola U. New Orleans; St. Louis University
- Occupations: Catholic priest, Jesuit
- Known for: Dealing with gangs and drug addiction
- Television: TV Seculo 21
- Board member of: WFTC, DPNA
- Awards: World Assoc.of Therapeutic Com., Harry Sholl Award
- Website: Haroldo

Harold Joseph Rahm (February 22, 1919 – November 30, 2019) was a Catholic priest and Jesuit, who became well known for his work with gangs and inner-city youth in El Paso, Texas, US. From there he went to Campinas, Brazil, where he extended his efforts at prevention and treatment of drug addiction and received wide acclaim for his initiatives.

== Texas ==
=== Early life ===
Harold Rahm was born in Tyler, Texas, on February 22, 1919, and during high school planned to become a doctor like his father. But he was drawn to the priesthood and tried the diocesan seminary. Not happy there, he read of the exploits of Jesuit priests Pere Marquette and Isaac Jogues, and decided to become a Jesuit. He entered the Jesuit novitiate in 1937 and was ordained a priest in 1950.

=== Assignment ===
"Haroldo" took as his motto "It is necessary to live life with joy." He shared with his Jesuit superior his desire to make life a little fairer, a little more filled with joy for those born into trying circumstances. Soon after ordination, in 1952, he was appointed assistant pastor at the large, Spanish-speaking parish of Sacred Heart in El Paso, covering the Chihuahuita district and Segundo Barrio. The church steeple is clearly visible from the border crossing with Ciudad Juárez, Chihuahua, just two blocks away. Along with him at Sacred Heart were four elderly priests to cover confessions and funerals and another young priest who served as pastor and covered the rectory duties. Rahm's task was to be out in the densely-packed neighborhood where second homes were in back yards and alleys had become streets. This neighborhood was one of the poorest in the nation.

=== Gang warfare ===
He traveled on a bicycle to deliver breakfast to the elderly, and to quickly reach places where the youth hung out. He immersed himself in the life of the people, visiting, having block Masses in their back yards, and accepting their advice. As he tackled the problems of youth gangs and drugs, he found ready help in downtown businessmen, in members of the El Paso Sertoma Club, and in the City Parks and Recreations Department.

At one point he heard of a gang fight scheduled for midnight, and found two gang leaders with knives drawn ready to go at each other. He impulsively grabbed one by the arm and flipped him on the ground, leaving the other youth gawking that a priest could do this. His being down to earth gained him the respect of the gangs and much help from the people. He cofounded Guadalupe Thrift Store, an employment office, and a credit union. He was given Monday night and Sunday afternoon slots on KROD-TV where he gave the youth a chance to perform – dance, dialogues, plays, and contests. Spanish-speaking KELP-TV was later added. The better-off students in the parish attended Bowie High school, and from there he got a leader for his Guadalupano Club, Edmundo Rodriguez, an all-district football center who would join the Jesuits and later become Rahm's provincial superior. Guadalupano Club held parties, weekend retreats, picnics, and spiritual meetings. As club membership spread among the youth, gangs were frustrated by their recruiting. But more important was his sports program which recruited young boys to play basketball, baseball, and other sports with the help of athletes from the El Paso College of Mines, now University of Texas in El Paso. Thomas Browne, Deputy Director of the Office of Anticrime Programs in the State Department’s Bureau of International Narcotics and Law Enforcement Affairs, asked who his greatest role model was, replied,

Father Harold Rahm, a Jesuit priest from Texas who is now very active in Brazil. The padre created the first successful anti-gang programs in the United States in the 1960s and was prominently featured by Sen. Estes Kefauver (D-Tenn.) in congressional field hearings across the nation. His book on working with gangs, Office in the Alley, was mandatory reading in my university juvenile delinquency course. He could have rested on his laurels with his gang work alone. Instead, he went to Brazil and created over 2,000 drug treatment, prevention and social service programs, including national, regional and global networks for prevention/treatment specialists. Today, he continues to work 14 hours a day, traveling the world, and solving problems at age of 95!

Office in the Alley tells the story of Our Lady's Youth Center, which Rahm built up out of an old building owned by the Knights of Columbus. It gradually developed into a complete sports and activities center, handling 600 youth a day. He recruited as assistant Ventura "Tula" Irrobali, a hero in the neighborhood for his basketball stardom at Texas Western College, now UTEP. Two boys trained by Tula gained national prominence, one as feather-weight National Golden Gloves Champion and the other as "Boy of the Year" representing El Paso's Boy's Club. Today Tula has a city park named after him, and the renamed "Father Rahm Avenue" runs through Segundo Barrio.

=== Reassignment ===
Pope John XXIII had asked the Jesuits in the USA to send more men to Latin America. Rahm's Jesuit superior, knowing that his projects in El Paso had able helpers, asked him to go to Brazil, and allowed him to choose his successor. Rahm persuaded Jesuit priest Richard Thomas, a former student of his in Tampa, to follow him at Sacred Heart.

== Brazil ==
=== Spirituality and training ===
In Texas Rahm had honed his skills at organizing, fundraising, and emphasizing the spiritual component, letting others run the programs he began. These skills served him well in Brazil.

Archbishop Dom Paulo de Tarso welcomed him to the Archdiocese of Campinas where Rahm organized parishioners to construct San Pedro Apostle church building, while he got to work on studying Portuguese. He also began working with the Cursillo movement which had just come to Brazil in 1962, and became its spiritual director. In 1967 he and lay collaborators created a kind of cursillo for youth.

In 1965 he founded the President Kennedy Social Center to train people for professional certification as typists, seamstresses, bricklayers, and electricians. Later, nursing, computer, and graphics were added, along with separate laboratories for the various courses, and a library. Today courses are offered, free of charge, in administrative assistant, accounting assistant, entrepreneurship, English, Spanish, Portuguese, CorelDRAW, PhotoShop, basic & advanced theater, free dance, and street dance.

In 1967 he and Mary Lamego founded Christian Leadership Training (TLC) at the Big House of Brandina Villa, working with a team of lay people to train youth to be Christian leaders, on mission. Today the movement is present in more than 80 places covering 38 dioceses throughout Brazil. Rahm asked Jesuit priest Casimiro Irala to teach liturgical songs to young people, and thus TLM was born (Musical Leadership Training). Irala later took off on his own and founded OPA, Prayer for Art, a movement that still exists, uniting art and spirituality by teaching songs to youth. Also, it was while he was in TLM that Jonas Abib was inspired to carry liturgical song to new heights.

In 1972 Rahm co-founded the movement Catholic Charismatic Renewal in Brazil. In 1975 he created "Prayer Experiences" as a part of this renewal. In 1976, concerned about women who turned to prostitution for a living in the neighborhood of Jardim Itatingahe, Rahm invited the Good Shepherd Sisters to assist in that area. In 1993 the nuns Maria Lourdes Vicari and Ana Maria Rocha Bastos founded the Centre of Studies and Promotion of Marginalized Women.

=== Campaign against drugs ===
In 1978 Rahm, along with Professor Osvaldo Candido Ferreira and Nubia França, founded Promotional Association for Prayer and Work (APOT), his most prominent work, for the treatment of those dependent on drugs and alcohol. It kept evolving, with separate programs for men, women, and children. Each program has a component to impart a sense of responsibility and technical skills, a spiritual component to create a sense of transcendence, and a support program like Alcoholics Anonymous (AA), Narcotics Anonymous (NA), and Tough Love (AE). Tough Love was initiated by Rahm in 1984, adapted from the American movement, for parents and family of drug addicts. It grew in Brazil to include 10,000 volunteers and 100,000 visits per month. APOT uses several separate facilities to offer integrated spiritual and physical rehabilitation. Lord Jesus Farm, founded in 1978, accommodates 70 men for a four-month program; Jimmy Hendricks House (1993) accommodates 40 youth for a six-months program; São José House accommodates 48 men for a 20-month program; Guadalupe House has since 1996 accommodated 17 women ages 14 to 45. In 2009, after Rahm's retirement as its president, APOT was renamed Padre Haroldo Institute. It had by then served 70,000 persons.

In 1987, Rahm founded Our Lady of Guadalupe Prevention and Assistance Center for the treatment of female drug addicts. In 1989 Beyond the Street Program was begun with Isilda Fernandes Rudecke and Maria Lucia Villela. Its first stage is an outreach to establish rapport with boys and girls ages 6–17, to give them hope for change and inform them of programs available. Open House Shelter is open 24 hours a day to conduct interviews and referral for these children. Middle House is located at the Lord Jesus Farm and can accommodate 50 boys 6-17.

In 1990, Rahm cofounded the Brazilian Federation of Therapeutic Communities (FEBRACT), remaining its president until 2012, and in 1992 the Latin American Federation of Therapeutic Communities (FLACT). In 1995 he lent support to the foundation of Program Learn More for adolescents, youth, and their families, for drug prevention and professional help. In 1998 APOT opened a clinic and began offering outpatient services. Rahm also cofounded Pastoral Sobriety that relates the search for sobriety to the Christian way of life.

In 2000, Rahm led Fraternity Campaign: For a World Without Drugs, drawing attention to the drug addiction problem both nationally and within religious communities. In 2001, in conjunction with the Campinas City Council, he founded Guadalupe House for street children, boys and girls.

In 2006 he began the campaign Faith in Prevention, an ecumenical movement, and produced a guidance booklet published by SENAD (National Policy on Drugs). In 2007 Rahm began Christian Yoga courses, bringing this practice to several cities in Brazil, with the theme of living in harmony with God, with nature. and within oneself.

In 2009 he stepped down from the presidency of APOT. The institute took on the work of Casa Verde, an overnight shelter and 24-hour service for street children.

=== A living symbol ===
At the national Freemind Conference in 2012, Rahm was described as a "symbol of the fight against drugs in Brazil." In 2013 Rahm helped found Early Circolando Project, a program which includes social education, prevention, care, and research, with a psychosocial team, educators, and art educators who circulate through highly vulnerable neighborhoods.

In 2009 Rahm was appearing weekly on Television and Life network "Tough Love", Mondays, 8-8:30 a.m., and "Relax and Live Happy", Tuesdays, 8-8:30 a.m., and on the program "Pastoral of Sobriety" on TV Seculo XXI, 7:30-9:00 p.m. He continued to hold honorary executive positions with Therapeutic Community organizations in Brazil (FEBRACT), Latin America (FLACT), and internationally (WFTC), and to serve as advisor on chemical dependency for the National Conference of Brazilian Bishops (CNBB). He was also a directing member of National Drug Prevention of the Americas (DPNA) and of Global Federation for Prevention of Drug Abuse.

== Death ==
Rahm died on November 30, 2019.

== Awards ==
Rahm received numerous awards from the city of Campinas. Some of his other awards are:

- Tough Love International: International Media Award (1984) & Tiffany Pelayo Award (1998).
- Anchieta Medal and Gratitude Diploma of the City of São Paulo (1987).
- Dom Quixote Award of Lulac National (1990).
- Benefactor of Humankind, awarded by the Grand Orient of Brazil Masons (1999).
- Cruz do Merito do Descobridor do Brasil Pedro Alvarez Cabral awarded by the Sociedade Brasileira de Heraldica Medalhistica, Cultural e Educational (2000).
- Ordem do Merito "Grande Oficial" awarded by Cruzada Bandeirante de Assistencia Medico Social dos Camilianos (2000).
- Merit Certificate for Valorization of Life awarded by the National Secretariat Against Drugs-SENAD and conferred by the President of Brazil (2002).
- Friend of the Social Justice and Juridical Assistance, awarded by the Military Police of São Paulo State (2003).
- Harry Sholl Award from WFTC, as President of FEBRACT (2006).
- Segundo Barrio Award, El Paso (2015).

== Selected writings ==
- Office in the Alley, with J. Weber. University of Texas, Hogg Foundation for Mental Health, 1958.
- Am I Not Here. Washington: Ave Maria Institute, 1963.
- E bom ser Padre!. São Paulo: Paulinas, 1975.
- A Mae das Americas. São Paulo: Loyola, 1992.
- Treinamento de Lideranga Crista. São Paulo: Loyola, 1998.
- 0 caminho da sobriedade – Fazenda do Senhor. São Paulo: Loyola, 2001.
