= Elias Fausto =

Municipality in the state of São Paulo in Brazil

- Municipality
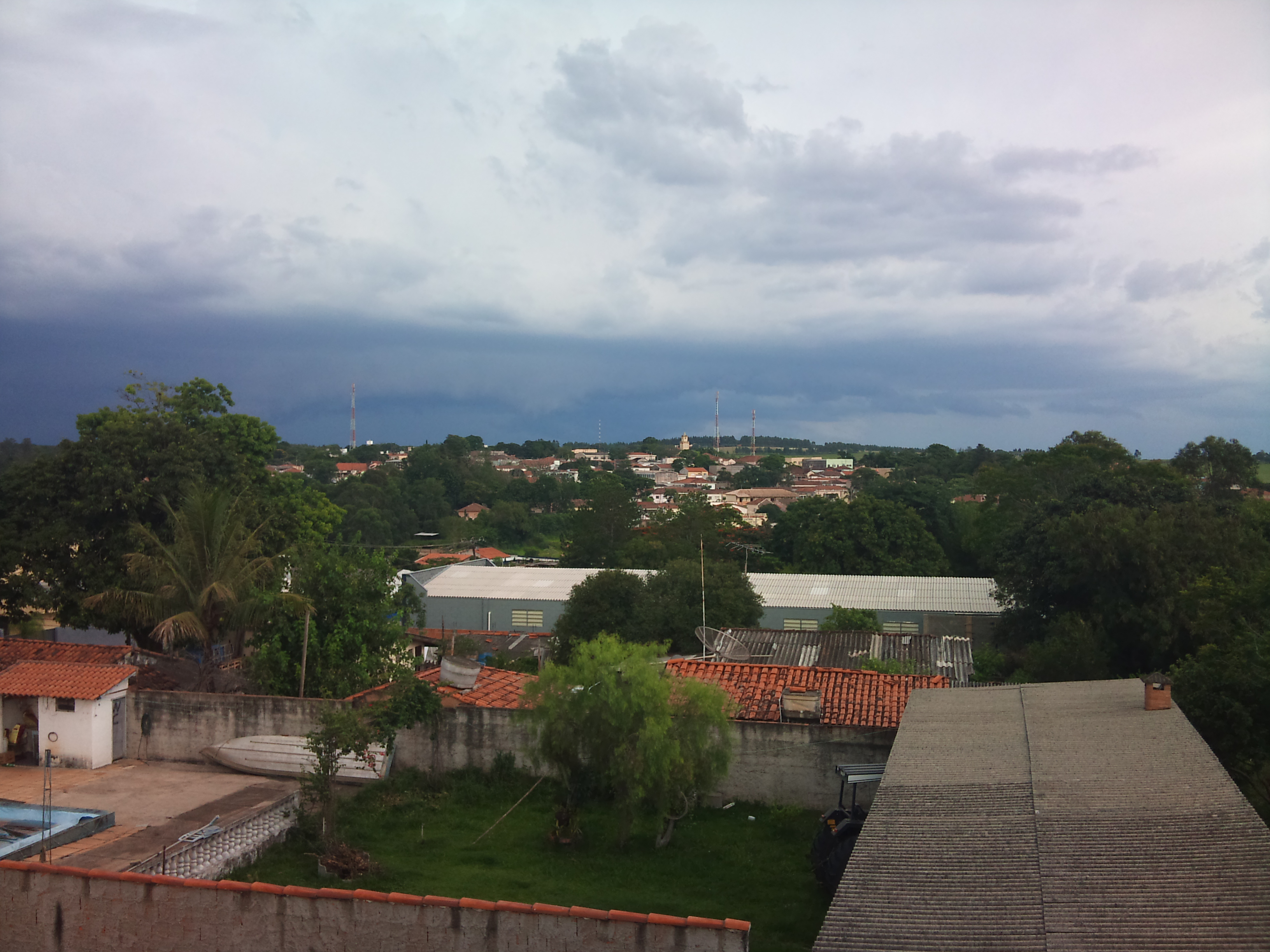
- View of Elias Fausto

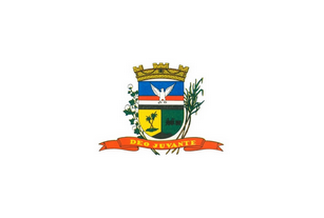
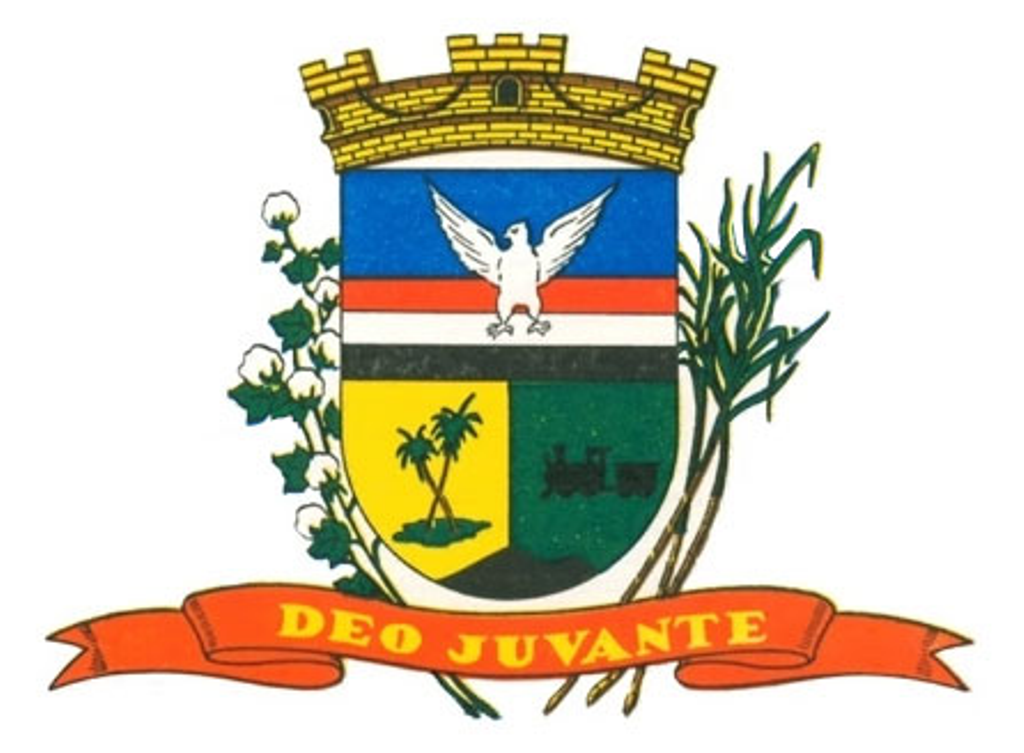
- Flag Coat of arms

- Location in São Paulo state

- Location in Brazil
- Coordinates: 23°2′34″S 47°22′26″W
- Country: Brazil
- Region: Southeast
- State: São Paulo

Area
  - Total: 202 km^{2} (78 sq mi)

Population (2020)
  - Total: 17,936
  - Density: 88.8/km^{2} (230/sq mi)
- Time zone: UTC−3 (BRT)

Elias Fausto is a municipality in the state of São Paulo in Brazil. The population is 17,936 (2020 est.) in an area of 202 km^{2}. The elevation is 605 m.

== History ==
The municipality was created by state law in 1944.

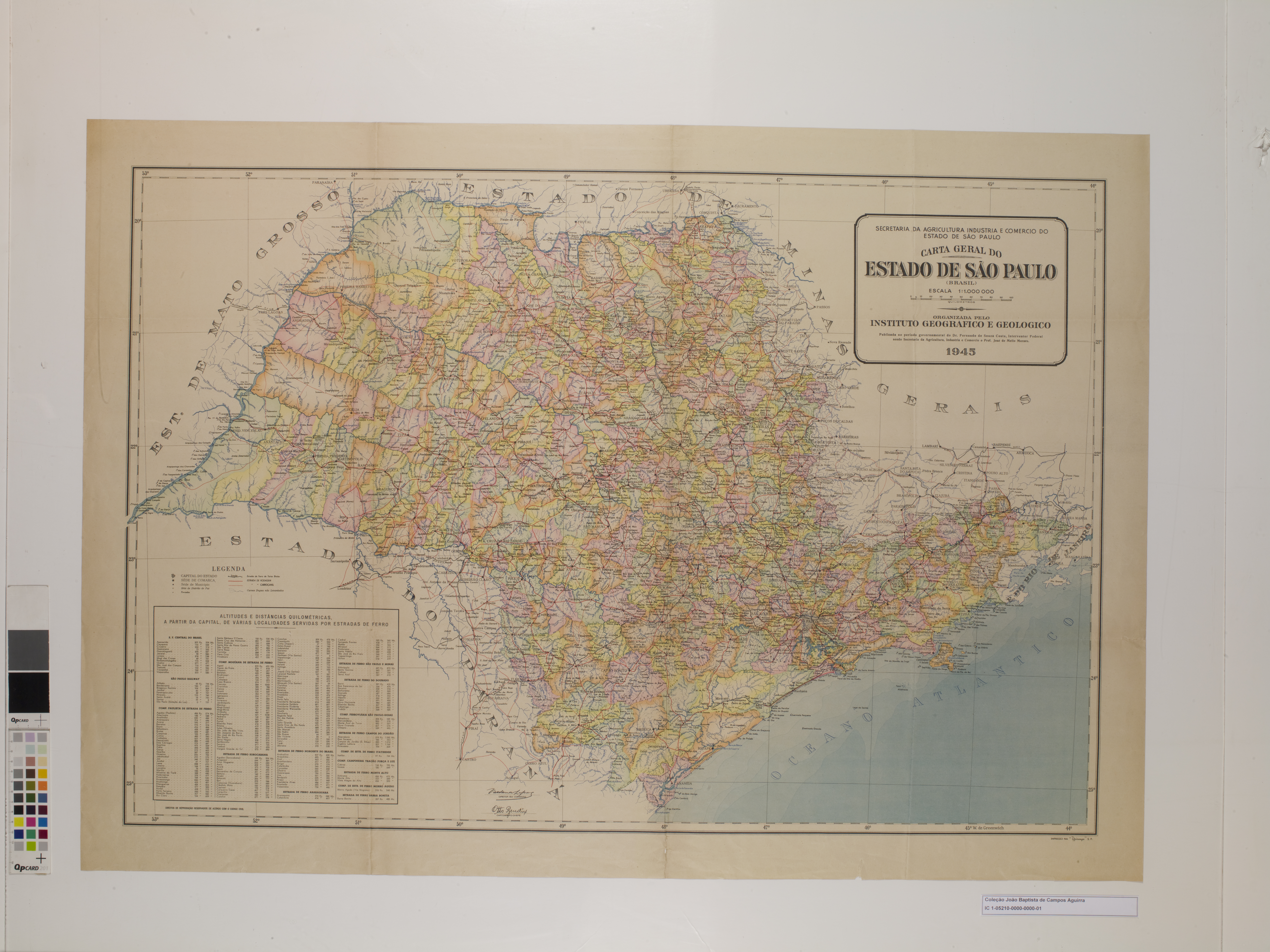
Map of the state of São Paulo (1944).

== Media ==
In telecommunications, the city was served by Telecomunicações de São Paulo. In July 1998, this company was acquired by Telefónica, which adopted the Vivo brand in 2012. The company is currently an operator of cell phones, fixed lines, internet (fiber optics/4G) and television (satellite and cable).

== See also ==
- List of municipalities in São Paulo
