= Preacher of the Papal Household =

Curial office of the Holy See

The Preacher of the Papal Household, also known as the Apostolic Preacher, is an office in the Roman Curia. This individual provides meditation to the pope as well as other senior officials of the Catholic Church while being the only cleric allowed to preach to the Pope. Roberto Pasolini, OFMCap was named to the post on 9 November 2024, replacing Raniero Cantalamessa, OFMCap, who had served since 1980.

== History ==
Established by Pope Paul IV in 1555, the position was initially unpopular among the prelates. This individual was given the task of reminding the members of the Papal Court of their respective duties. Prior to this, four General Procurators took turns to preach on the Sundays of Advent and Lent. Under the new system, one person would be appointed from different religious orders.

In 1753, during the reign of Pope Benedict XIV, the brief Inclytum Fratrum Minorum reserved the office exclusively to members of the Order of Capuchin Friars Minor. It was stated this change took place because of "the example of Christian piety and religious perfection, the splendor of doctrine and the Apostolic Zeal" found in the Order.

== Apostolic Preachers ==
Among the more notable apostolic preachers are:

- Alonso Salmerón
- Francis Toleto
- Anselmus Marzatti
- Francis Cassini
- Bonaventure Barberini
- Michael Francesch
- Ludovico Micara of Frascati
- Lewis of Trent
- Raniero Cantalamessa

== See also ==
- Theologian of the Pontifical Household
