= Canção Nova =

Catholic community in Brazil

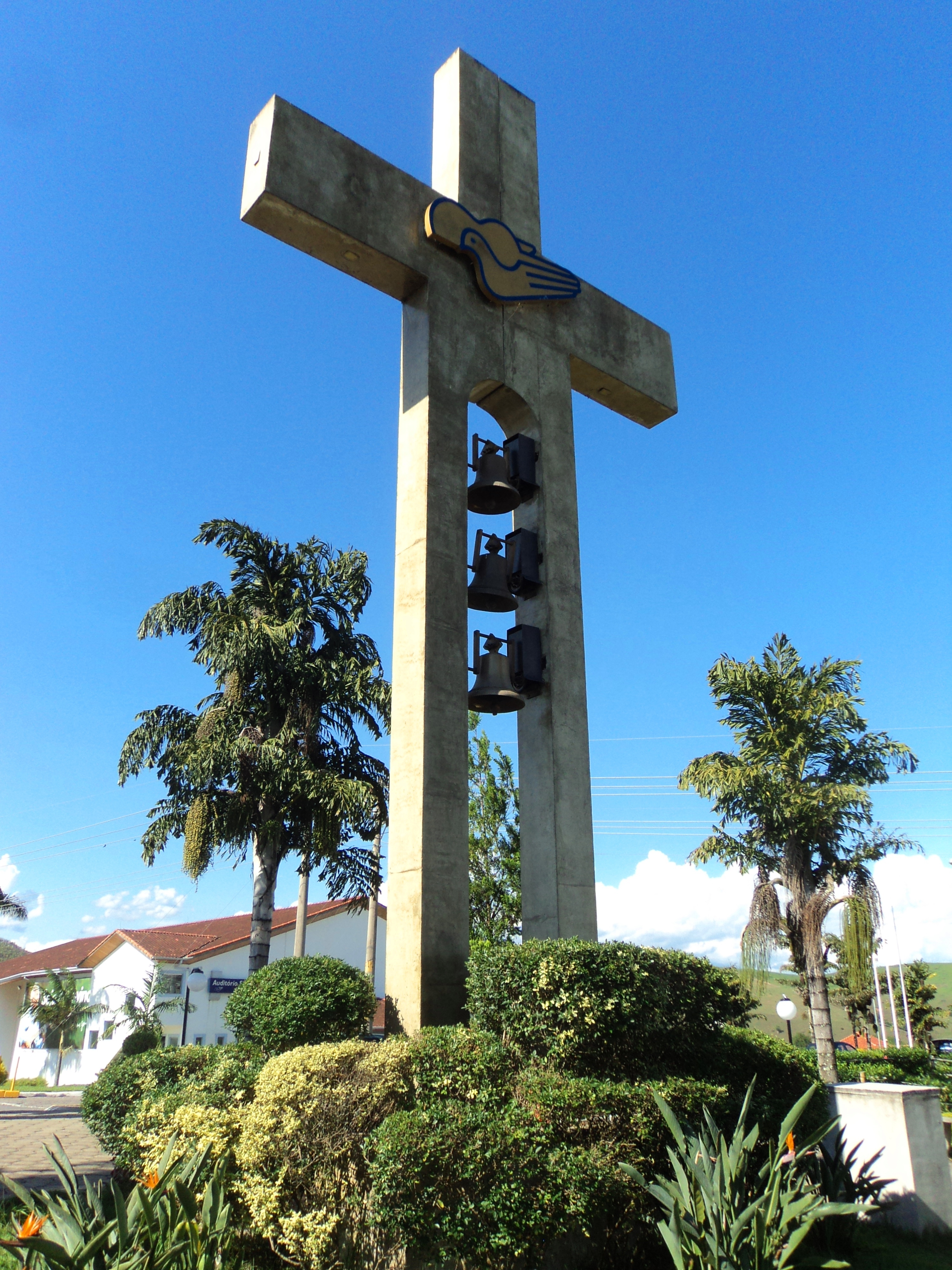
- Cross at the entrance of the Canção Nova community, Cachoeira Paulista, Brazil
- Formation: 3 November 2008; 17 years ago
- Type: International Private Association of Faithful
- Headquarters: Brazil, Cachoeira Paulista, São Paulo
- Region served: Brazil, Paraguay, Portugal, Italy, France, Israel and United States
- Leader: Jonas Abib
- Affiliations: Catholic Church, Catholic Charismatic Renewal
- Website: comunidade.cancaonova.com

The Canção Nova (English: New Song) is a Brazilian Catholic community founded by Monsignor Jonas Abib in 1978, following the lines of Catholic Charismatic Renewal. Headquartered in the city of Cachoeira Paulista (SP), it occupies an area of 372,000 m2 and has a long-range radio and television system, extending to other countries such as Portugal, Italy, Israel, France and Paraguay.

== History ==
Four decades ago (1976), when Archbishop Antonio Afonso de Miranda, Emeritus Bishop of Taubaté, told then Father Jonas Abib: "Since you work with young people, start with the young that is easier," this priest understands as called God and that has leveraged the first members and continues to intensify today. In 1968, the first meetings with young people began, and from 1972 began the experiences of prayer in the Holy Spirit in Lorraine for the first personal meeting with Christ and the baptism in the Holy Spirit, when the need arose and a structured and adequate room for such meetings, was when in the city of Areias (SP) found a farm that instituted the birth of the Canção Nova Association, after two years, began to the first Mission House was built in the neighboring city of Queluz, which was named “Canção Nova - the House of Mary”.

In June 1976, the first meeting for girls, called the Maranathá of girls, was held by Monsignor Antonio Afonso de Miranda, then Bishop of Lorena. Thus the evangelizing bases of the Canção Nova were born, with Father Jonas attending the office where he was given the mission to put into practice the Apostolic Exhortation Evangelii Nuntiandi: Evangelization in the Contemporary World, signed by Pope Paul VI on December 8 and published on December 21, 1975. In the year following 1977, Fr. Jonas through a catechesis course aimed at young people, turning into meetings called “Catechumenates”, he surpassed the limits, attracting the parents of this youth who perceived the transformation of their children and awakened their desire for this “something new”, happening faithfully. This was reflected in the document presented by the aforementioned bishop: “... Touched by grace, they gradually discover the face of Christ and expound nurtured the need to give Him up ”(EN, n. 44).

Later, Father Jonas went further, decided to start an internal “Catechumenate”, but the young people would have to leave their families, their homes and their studies to give themselves to the Holy Spirit, and the first to be invited to this challenge were the young people of Queluz and only 12 accepted, so on February 2, 1978, the Canção Nova Community began. More and more, Fr. Jonas continued to follow another chapter of the pontifical document: “In our century so marked by mass media, the first proclamation, catechesis or the deepening of the faith cannot fail to use these means, as we have already emphasized. Put at the service of the Gospel, such means are capable of widening, almost to infinity, the field to be able to hear the Word of God and to bring the Good News to millions. The Church would feel guilty before Her Lord if she did not use these potent means which human intelligence makes ever more perfect. It is by using them that he 'preaches upon the terraces' the message that she is the keeper. In them you find a modern and effective version of the pulpit. Thanks to them you can talk to the crowds ”(EN, n.45).

After the 1979 Carnival Retreat, called "Rebanhão", held in the city of Cruzeiro, began the construction of four mission houses in Cachoeira Paulista, even knowing they received by donation only a strip of land, and only one building was built. After numerous achievements, Jonas Abib, now Monsignor, declared: “Cachoeira Paulista is the place where God has placed us to live the mission of evangelization in a privileged way to carry out this evangelization through the media: the media, ”concludes Monsignor Jonas.

On November 3, 2008, Canção Nova reached the Pontifical Recognition, receiving approval of its statutes from the Holy See and on this date were present in Rome, the founder of the Catholic community, Monsignor Jonas Abib along with the co-founders, Luzia Santiago and her husband Wellington Jardim; surrounded by dozens of Brazilian missionaries, friends and bishops, they celebrated the “yes” of the Church so that the mission of this Work of Evangelization could spread throughout the world.

== Evangelization ==
The Canção Nova Community is one of the largest media systems for Catholic Evangelization in the world. In addition to having several radio stations spread throughout Brazil, it has a TV station that can be tuned in some cities by UHF and HDTV, and throughout the national territory via satellite, and is present in the line up of major pay-TV operators in Brazil.

Canção Nova promotes events throughout Brazil, such as concerts, retreats, meetings, prayer camps, and also has a diverse product line: books, CDs, DVDs, LPO, videos, clothing, among other things.

== Structure ==
Canção Nova has a covered stadium in its headquarters, the Dom João Hipólito de Moraes Evangelization Center, with capacity to receive about 80 thousand people. It is one of the largest indoor venues for Catholic events in Latin America.

There is also the Rincão do Meu Senhor for 5,000 people with an area of 1,815 m2 and the São Paulo Auditorium for 580 people with an area of 1,400 m2.

The headquarters also houses chapels, a medical post, a school, a restaurant, a bakery, a cafeteria, a bank, a religious articles store, a lodge, a campground, administrative buildings and social works.

Average camps are 18 per year - not counting the Kairos on Sundays and Thursdays of worship. This 'little piece of heaven' (as it is affectionately called by the Canção Nova community) receives around 550,000 pilgrims annually.

== Mission Fronts ==
Canção Nova has 6 mission fronts abroad, namely: Toulon in France, Rome in Italy, Jerusalem in Israel, Fátima in Portugal, Asunción in Paraguay and Long Branch, NJ in the USA.

With their various homes in Brazil and some abroad, they evangelize through events, pilgrimages and the Catholic media, gathering groups of people who participate in their activities and their prayer groups.

== Canção Nova Communication System ==
Canção Nova Telecommunication System operates in the three means of telecommunications, which are: radio, TV and Internet, as well as a publisher.

=== Media ===
They broadcast on their television, relays, radios, and the Internet 24 hours of programming aimed at Catholic indoctrination. In particular, its daily meetings and prayer times that take place at your headquarters. In the other hours of their stations, it broadcasts only indoctrination programs, and some others indirectly focused or based on this purpose. The system is maintained without commercial advertisements, relying on spontaneous donations from Listeners' Campaigns and sale of products linked to the "Canção Nova" brand through the DAVI-Visual Audio Department.

=== Editorial ===
Canção Nova has also been in the publishing market for fifteen years and has more than 100 titles including publications in the areas of Catholic religiosity (devotional, orational and formation works), children's and biographical books. Canção Nova Publisher has already won important sales marks: "A Bíblia foi Escrita Pra Você" and "Sim, sim!" Não, não!", Both books of Monsignor Jonas Abib, founder of the Canção Nova Community, sold together almost one million copies.

In addition, several works have been translated into English and Spanish and marketed in several other countries, such as the United States, Italy, the Philippines, and all of Latin America. Among its main authors are: Mons. Jonas Abib, Father Léo, Gabriel Chalita, Myrian Rios, Prof. Felipe Aquino, Father Fábio de Melo, Dr. Roque Marcos Savioli, Prado Flores, Father Rufus Pereira, Monsignor Alberto Taveira Corrêa, Father Adriano Zandoná, professor Scott Hahn and Luzia Santiago.

=== Music ===
One of the Canção Nova's tools for evangelism is music. Salette Ferreira, Deacon Nelsinho Corrêa, Rogerinha, Juliana de Paula, Thiago Tomé, Laura Pitter, Emanuel Stênio and Márcio Todeschini are some of the singers. Members of the music ministry include Brais Oss, Rinaldo, and conductor Sapo.

Monsignor Jonas Abib is also one of the Catholic evangelists through Christian music in the Canção Nova Community.

=== Evangelization Club ===
Previously, communication with people who help the Catholic community through donations was done by the Listener Club. But the Canção Nova Communication System has grown and, in addition to the listeners of radio - Canção Nova's first vehicle of evangelization - today, it also reaches viewers, through TV Canção Nova; and the netizens, by Portal Canção Nova.

For years a new name had been thought of that encompassed this larger universe of action. After much discernment and prayer, we came to a "global" name: Evangelization Club, which better reflects the strong and active reality of all members.

== Evangelization Centers ==
Canção Nova is headquartered at Chácara Santa Cruz in Cachoeira Paulista, and has two spaces for holding events, Rincão and Dom João Hipólito de Moraes Evangelization Center. The DAVI-Visual Audio Department acts as a distribution center for all Canção Nova products. Like Catholic orders and other religions, the Canção Nova Community has the contribution of the faithful through donations in general. It is estimated that the community generates about 15 million reais per month. This money comes from spontaneous donations Listeners Campaigns. The sale of products related to the "Canção Nova" image is also pointed as a great source of revenue. Among the main products sold are bibles, DVDs, CDs, T-shirts, books and images of saints.

=== Thug ===
There is a large meeting space for the faithful, known as the Dom João Hipólito de Moraes Evangelization Center, one of the largest covered spaces for Catholic events in Latin America, with a capacity of 80,000 people;. There is also behind the Evangelization Center a food court, ATMs, parking and restrooms. The Evangelization Center is used for large national and international meetings.

=== Sanctuary of the Father of Mercies ===
In 2008 began the works for a sanctuary at the Canção Nova headquarters in Cachoeira Paulista. The purpose of the Sanctuary of the Father of Mercies is to welcome pilgrims who come to the Canção Nova as good as possible to seek a deep experience with God through prayer events held in the community. The site is designed to hold about 10,000 people and will also have a permanent worship chapel to attend confessions and pray, as well as toilets. The built area is approximately 6,260 m^{2}.

The title of Shrine was made official in December 2012 by Bishop Benedito Beni, Bishop of the Diocese of Lorena.

On December 5, 2014, the Sanctuary's dedication ceremony was celebrated as part of the 50th anniversary of the priesthood of Monsignor Jonas Abib, whose priestly ordination was on December 8, 1964.

=== Hosanna Brazil ===
The event originated in 2004, when the construction of the Dom João Hipólito de Moraes Evangelization Center was completed. The intention was to create a different camp to inaugurate the site and to thank God for this great victory achieved by the Canção Nova Community, which was only possible thanks to the gold donation made spontaneously by thousands of people.

The John Paul II Foundation - maintainer of the New Song Communication System - held a contest among employees to choose the name of the event, which would be held in celebration of the inauguration of the Evangelization Center.

The winner was Eugênio Jorge, who is music minister and founder of the Message Brazil mission. He suggested this name because he believed that the “New Rincão” - as the place is also known - would be the place from which praises rise without ceasing to heaven through the children of God: “Hosanna Brazil!, for if our praise ceases the stones will cry out ”(cf. Luke 19:40).

The camp is the biggest event held by Canção Nova. In its first edition, it brought together approximately 200,000 people and each year thousands more come from all over the world.

== See also ==
- Catholic Charismatic Renewal
- Catholic Church
- Catholic television
- Catholic television channels
- Catholic television networks
- Consecrated life
- Evangelical counsels
- Jonas Abib
- Shalom Catholic Community
- Guido Schaffer
