= Aglow International =

Christian organization based in Washington state

Aglow International is an interdenominational organization of Christian people. It is based in Seattle and Washington, US and has more than 200,000 members.

== Overview ==
Formerly known as The Women's Aglow Fellowship, the organisation has more than 200,000 members. Local Aglow groups hold monthly meetings in 171 nations. There are more than 21,000 Aglow leaders worldwide. An estimated 17 million people participate each year through 4600 groups around the world.

The organization was born in 1967 out of the charismatic movement that swept the US in the 1960s.

Although Aglow has an overarching mission and identity, each local group is allowed to develop ministries that its leaders deem appropriate for their particular group. Aglow operates many programs including small group studies, care (support) groups, retreats, and annual conferences. Aglow groups may also choose to expand into clothing, food, house cleaning, babysitting, and the mentorship of young people. Other activities may involve people in prison, in senior homes, inner city neighborhoods, mental institutions, or single parents.

Aglow International is a non-profit organization and a member of the Evangelical Council for Financial Accountability (ECFA). It is headquartered in Edmonds, Washington.

== History ==
Aglow International traces its roots back to 1967 when four women, who were wives of members of the Full Gospel Business Men's Fellowship International, desired to meet together as Christians without denominational boundaries. The four women were wives of members of the Full Gospel Business Men's Fellowship International. The women wanted a similar women's devotional association, "one where 'those coming into the charismatic renewal could meet to pray, fellowship, and listen to the testimonies of other Christian women.' The women formed the Full Gospel Women's Fellowship in a few months, which spread rapidly." The first general meeting in Seattle drew more than 100 women to the Meany Hotel close to the University of Washington campus. It did not take long for women who attended that first meeting to invite their neighbours and friends to regular meetings in other communities surrounding Seattle. Word spread, and new groups began springing up around Washington.

By 1972, more than 60 local groups held monthly meetings around the US, and the Full Gospel Women's Fellowship was incorporated as the Women's Aglow Fellowship International. Within the next year, groups began in Canada, New Zealand, and The Netherlands, making Aglow an international "network of caring women."

In 1981, Aglow's President, Jane Hansen, began to speak and write about the restoration of women according to the significance of their created role as outlined in the Bible. This grew into Aglow's teaching on the importance of male/female reconciliation in the Church. In 1991 and 1995, Aglow began focusing on ministering to Muslims. Aglow tries to bring awareness about Islam to Christians and also sponsors an Arabic Language television show that is geared specifically for Muslim women.

Women's Aglow Fellowship changed its name to Aglow International in 1995. This change was instituted to encompass the growing global nature of the organization.

In 2001, Aglow decided to stand with and support the nation of Israel and the Jewish people in the following areas:

- To expose anti-Semitism and false doctrines which seek to destroy the Jewish people such as Replacement Theology or Supersessionism, calling for repentance in the Church at large;
- To love, support, honour, and esteem the Jewish people as the root from which Christianity has grown (Romans 11:18)

Aglow marked its 40th year in 2007. More than 200,000 Aglow members celebrated worldwide, and many attended commemorative events, including an international conference September 20-23 in the organization's founding city, Seattle, and a tour of Israel - the group's seventh such journey to the Holy Land since 2000.

== Structure ==
Aglow International has a hierarchical leadership structure. Within the United States, local Aglow groups are called Lighthouses. The local groups are composed of women who come together for Bible Study, teachings, and also to perform community outreach tasks and events. Meetings can take place in any location from homes to community halls to prisons. Lighthouses and Candlelight groups are under the leadership of local women who have undergone the requisite leadership training. These leaders are in turn under the authority of Area Teams. Area Teams give oversight to multiple groups in a particular region or area. National Directors or Presidents oversee all the Area Teams in a nation. All the leaders in these offices are indigenous women who have also undergone leadership training. In keeping with its charismatic roots, Aglow requires all its leaders to show evidence of the Baptism in the Holy Spirit by being able to speak in tongues.

Each region in the world has a Prayer Coordinator who oversees and coordinates the prayer ministry under the oversight of the Prayer Director. The entire structure of Aglow is under the leadership of the International Board of Directors, of which Jane Hansen is the President. This International Board is composed of 11 women of different nationalities who are Aglow national leaders within their own countries as well. Each Aglow group also has at least one male advisor - usually a person of some prominence within an evangelical church. "This structure, together with leadership seminars for specific regions as well as national and worldwide conferences, comprises an international support network and helps to ensure that each local group reflects Aglow's essential identity."

All of the persons in these positions of leadership give their time voluntarily. The only exception is the paid staff of thirty-two at the Aglow Worldwide Headquarters in Edmonds, Washington. This staff is responsible for the financial well-being of the organization, the implementation of its goals and purposes, the organization of national conferences and events, and all promotional and advertising materials.

An individual who decides to become a member of Aglow will commit to regular prayer for the organization as well as financial support in free-will donations. However, people are free to attend Aglow meetings without becoming a covenant partners. Aglow International receives most of its funding from covenant partner donations, individual donations, conference fees, and grants from foundations. A current financial report can be found on the ECFA's website.

== Beliefs and practices ==
Aglow believes that Jesus died and rose again. They believe in Jesus’ redemptive work and that those who repent of their sin and personally accept the Jesus as Savior receive the forgiveness of sin and everlasting life. They believe that marriage is a divine institution and that sexual intimacy is designed within the context of marriage between one man and one woman. The group believes in creating an atmosphere of love and restoration.

== Ministries ==
Aglow has several ministries including;

- Prayer
- Generations
- Men of Issachar
- Transformation
- Anti-Human Trafficking
- Israel
- Emergency and Disaster Preparedness
- Prison Ministry

=== Mission ===
Aglow's mission is;

1. To restore and mobilize women and men around the world
2. To promote gender reconciliation in the Body of Christ as God designed
3. To amplify awareness of global concerns from a biblical perspective

==== Restoration and mobilization of women ====
Aglow believes that in order to be restored, a woman must first be saved and restored to a relationship with God. Part of restoration is discipleship, prayer, encouragement, and emotional healing - all of which come through relationships. Aglow believes that true restoration of a woman can only occur after she has reached a place of desperation and is willing to turn completely to God for help. After this act of surrender, God is able to work through her and heal her emotionally and spiritually. In addition to the spiritual restoration of women, Aglow also believes in their physical restoration and empowerment and works to elevate the status of women worldwide.

To mobilize is "to gather together, to activate, to assemble." Aglow mobilizes women to be servant leaders its international prayer network and leadership development. Any leader within Aglow first has to go through training before she is allowed to take a leadership post.

==== Gender reconciliation ====
In 1981, the issue of restoration of women led Hansen to the issue of male and female reconciliation in the Church. According to Hansen, this issue seeks to restore the biblical view of God's purpose for creation which Aglow bases on Genesis 1:26–28. Aglow believes this purpose was to have a family, a people who would share God's life, nature, spirit, vision, and purpose, and through whom God would express his life, power, and glory on earth. Hansen believes that it takes male and female together to fulfil this purpose and that the restoration of this foundational relationship is necessary before the Church as a whole can fulfil its destiny to express God's image.

Hansen believes that women were "uniquely and specifically designed to stand before the man in an intimate, face-to-face relationship." However, although women were meant to look to God to find their life, identity, value and significance, since the fall of Eve in the dawn of creation, they have looked instead to men to fulfill these needs. Hansen states that only when "a woman's heart is turned back to God to meet her needs, she is…free to be the help God intended her to be: to draw the man out of his aloneness by relating on a level that moves past the surface and touches the deep places of his heart. She is then able to stand in a healthy, face-to-face relationship with him."

Aglow offers seminars and workshops to help women in the practical application of male-female reconciliation. The seminars teach women how to find "fulfilment and joy in their daily relationships…to create families full of joy and marriages free from resentment." Participants report that these teachings have helped to restore their marriages and other significant relationships.

==== Global concerns ====
Aglow women conduct outreach efforts, specifically in refugee camps and war-torn nations. Aglow Relief, a subsidiary of Aglow International, has been incorporated for humanitarian and compassion purposes.

Aglow has partnered with many organizations worldwide to further its humanitarian interests. In May 2006, more than $30,000 and half a ton of humanitarian supplies were carried to Israel in suitcases by 600 men and women in an Aglow-sponsored solidarity tour. This aid was disseminated to many organizations in Israel such as the Yemin Orde Youth Village near Haifa, the Magen David Adom blood donation center in Jerusalem, the Ethiopian Absorption Center in Mevaseret Zion and the Ma'aynei Hayeshua Medical Center in Bnei Brak.

More than $20,000 was also donated to Aglow members who were victims of Hurricane Katrina.

Aglow also partners with charitable organizations in the cities where their yearly conferences are held. Conference locations vary from year to year. In 2006, Aglow partnered with the City on a Hill, an organization in Milwaukee, Wisconsin, dedicated to meeting the needs of the central city by providing hands-on missions training, faith-based multicultural education, community outreach, economic empowerment, housing developments, and health and social services. Participants at the Aglow conference prayed specifically for this charity and also made sizeable donations to further its outreach.

Aglow has also received many grants and funding from secular organizations. A donation of $40,000 was made in September 2006 to the Ghana branch of Aglow by Western Union Money Transfer. This money was given in aid of the construction of a women's vocational institute. The vocational institute will offer training in Craft and Handiwork, Management and Catering, Dressmaking, Batik Making, Hairdressing, Secretarial Studies, Bookkeeping, Accounting, Communication Skills, Basic Education, as well as Snail farming and Mushroom farming. Western Union made this donation to assist Aglow in their mission to empower women in the community of Ghana.

=== Prayer ===
Aglow believes God has called the organization to be a "Global House of Prayer." Aglow women pray in small groups and in large national and international gatherings. In her book about Aglow International, God's Daughters, R. Marie Griffith states that, "God calls his daughters to perform mighty acts and inaugurate prodigious transformations through their prayers, rendering Christian women vital instruments of regeneration and healing to a broken and dying world."

== Tax issues ==
There exist 920 Aglow International entities that are classified by the IRS as churches. They are not required to file annual reports (form 990) with the IRS which are otherwise available for public view.
