= Cachoeira Paulista =

- Municipality
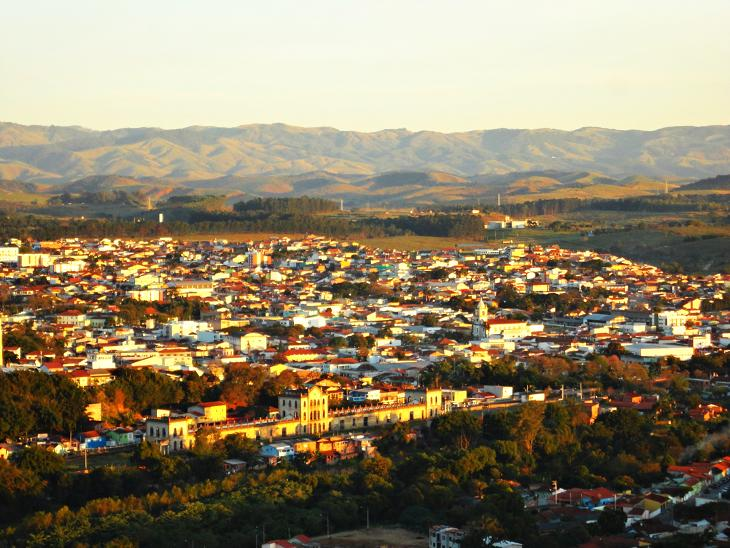
- Panoramic View

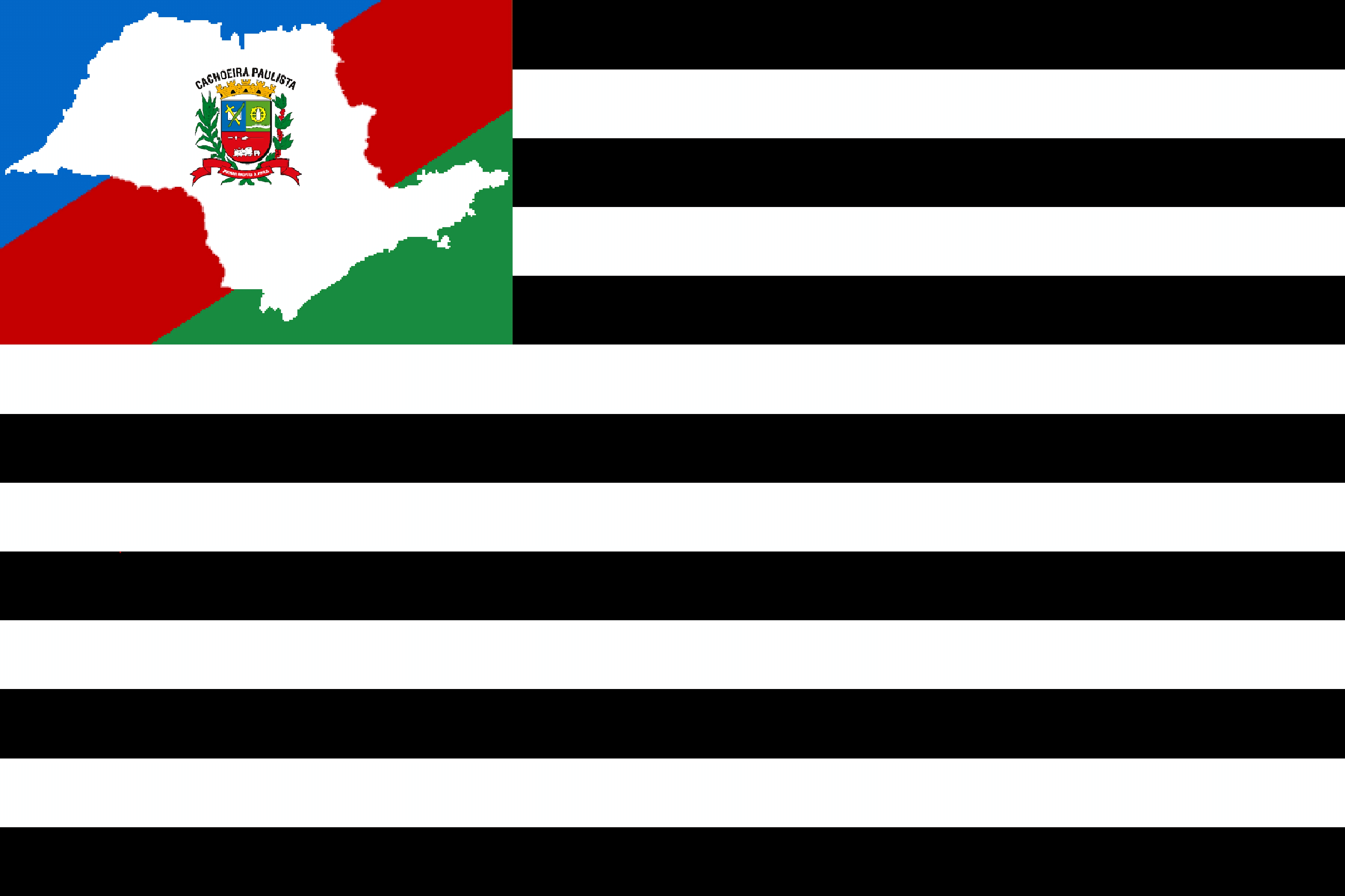
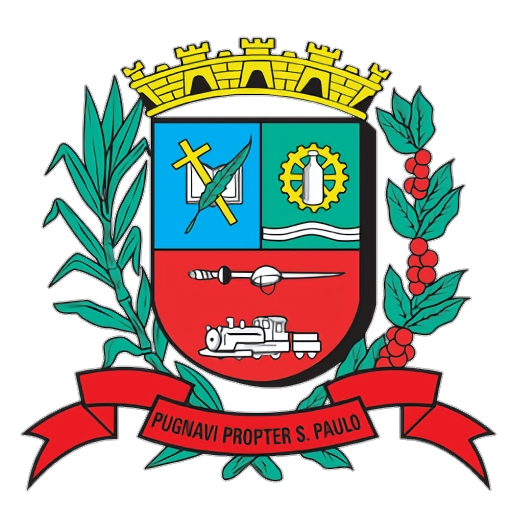
- Flag Coat of arms

- Location in São Paulo state

- Location in Brazil
- Coordinates: 22°39′54″S 45°0′34″W
- Country: Brazil
- Region: Southeast Brazil
- State: São Paulo
- Metropolitan Region: Vale do Paraíba e Litoral Norte

Area
  - Total: 287.99 km^{2} (111.19 sq mi)
- Elevation: 521 m (1,709 ft)

Population (2020)
  - Total: 33,581
  - Density: 116.60/km^{2} (302.00/sq mi)
- Time zone: UTC−3 (BRT)

Cachoeira Paulista is a municipality in the state of São Paulo in Brazil. It is part of the Metropolitan Region of Vale do Paraíba e Litoral Norte, in the Guaratinguetá Microregion.

It is located at latitude 22º39'54 "south and longitude 45º00'34" west, being at an altitude of 521 meters. Its estimated population in 2020 was 33,581 inhabitants.

It has as bordering cities Cruzeiro to the north, Silveiras to the east, Lorena to the south and west and Canas to the southwest. People or things that come from or inhabit in Cachoeira Paulista are called "cachoeirense".

The Brazilian Decimetric Array radio telescope is situated in Cachoeira Paulista.

The municipality contains part of the 292,000-hectare (720,000-acre) Mananciais do Rio Paraíba do Sul Environmental Protection Area, created in 1982 to protect the sources of the Paraíba do Sul river.

== History ==
Documents from 1730 cite a settlement belonging to the Village of Lorena, called Arraial of the Porto da Caxoeira, whose initial landmark of the primitive nucleus was a small hermitage erected by devotees in honor of Lord Bom Jesus da Cana Verde, in the year 1780. On October 18, 1784, Manoel da Silva Caldas and his wife, Ângela Maria de Jesus, donated "two fathoms wide by half a mile long on the left bank of the Paraíba do Sul River, to the borders with the Embaú," to the patrimony of the new Chapel of the Bom Jesus da Cana Verde, erected in its lands by Sebastiana de Tal, constituting in fact the camp that allowed the expansion of the village there installed.

The first buildings installed consisted of huts of sertanejos (settlers), mostly fishermen, who took their sustenance from the Paraíba River. The first street of Cachoeira was Bom Jesus Street, which at that time left the chapel and advanced to the route through which the muleteers headed for Minas Gerais. The great movement of muleteers, which went to the ports of Paraty and Mambucaba consolidated the character of the old settlement, centered in the canoe ports of the Rivers Paraíba and Bocaína, mainly with the implantation of coffee cultivation. Under these conditions, was created in 1876, the Parish of Santo Antonio do Porto da Cachoeira. Four years later the name was changed to Santo Antonio of the Bocaina, evoking the landscape of the mountain ranges of the Bocaíca that surround the place.

On August 18, 1822, Prince Regent Dom Pedro I passed through the city, during his trip from Rio de Janeiro to Santos, during the events that preceded the proclamation of Brazil's independence. It was in the old settlement called Santo Antônio da Cachoeira, where he takes a break for dinner, that Dom Pedro and his entourage exchanged mules for horses purchased from farmers in the region by João Phelipe David, an officer of the royal guard and future Baron of Santo Antônio da Cachoeira, who had recruited several militiamen for the separatist cause.

One of the most significant historical moments of the city occurred in 1932, during the Constitutionalist Revolution. During this period, the municipality became a war-zone, becoming the headquarters of the Constitutionalist Movement.

=== Administrative History ===
Parish created under the name of Santo Antonio da Bocaína, by provincial law No. 37, dated 03/29/1876, subordinate to the municipality of Lorena. High to the category of town with the denomination of Santo Antonio of Bocaína, by the provincial law nº 5, of 03/03/1880, dismembered of Lorena. Seat in the old town of Santo Antonio da Cachoeira. Constituted of the district headquarters. Installed 1/8/1883. It was called Bocaína, when it was elevated to the category of City, according to municipal law nº 14, of 05/15/1895. In administrative division of 1911, the municipality of Bocaína is constituted of the district headquarters. It is now known as Cachoeira, according to Law No. 1,470 of 10/29/1915, thus remaining in territorial divisions dated 12/31/1936 and 12/31/1937. It was renamed Valpaíba, on November 30, 1944, by virtue of Decree No. 14,334. Finally, on December 24, 1948, the municipality became known as Cachoeira Paulista.

=== Toponymy ===
The origin of the name Cachoeira Paulista is due to the fact that Rio Paraíba has some stretches and waterfalls at that point, making of the place the last navigable point of the river in the way of the current.

== Geography ==
=== Landscape ===
Located deep in the Paraíba do Sul River Valley, between the Mantiqueira, Bocaíca and Mar Sierras, coordinates of 22º39'54 "south latitude and longitude 45º00'34" west and altitude is 521m. It has rugged relief, with several hills and hills and a large area of flooded fluvial plain. It has a subtropical climate, with well defined seasons, hot and rainy summers and cold and dry winters, with average precipitation of 1200mm. It suffers the influence of the semi-humid climate of the surrounding Sierras, which makes the climate very unstable, with great variation of temperature throughout the day. The municipality still has pockets of native vegetation, especially in rural areas and hillsides, however, much of the territory has already been deforested and consists of areas for agriculture and cattle raising.

== Demographics ==
Historical population (municipality)
| Year | Population | %± |
|---|---|---|
| 1920 | 9,691 |
| 1940 | 9,137 | −5.7% |
| 1950 | 12,492 | 36.7% |
| 1960 | 15,538 | 24.4% |
| 1970 | 17,336 | 11.6% |
| 1980 | 20,557 | 18.6% |
| 1991 | 23,212 | 12.9% |
| 2000 | 27,205 | 17.2% |
| 2010 | 30,091 | 10.6% |
| 2022 | 31,564 | 4.9% |

According to the 2010 IBGE Census, the population was 32,773 (2017 est.), in an area of 287.99 km^{2}.

== Religion ==
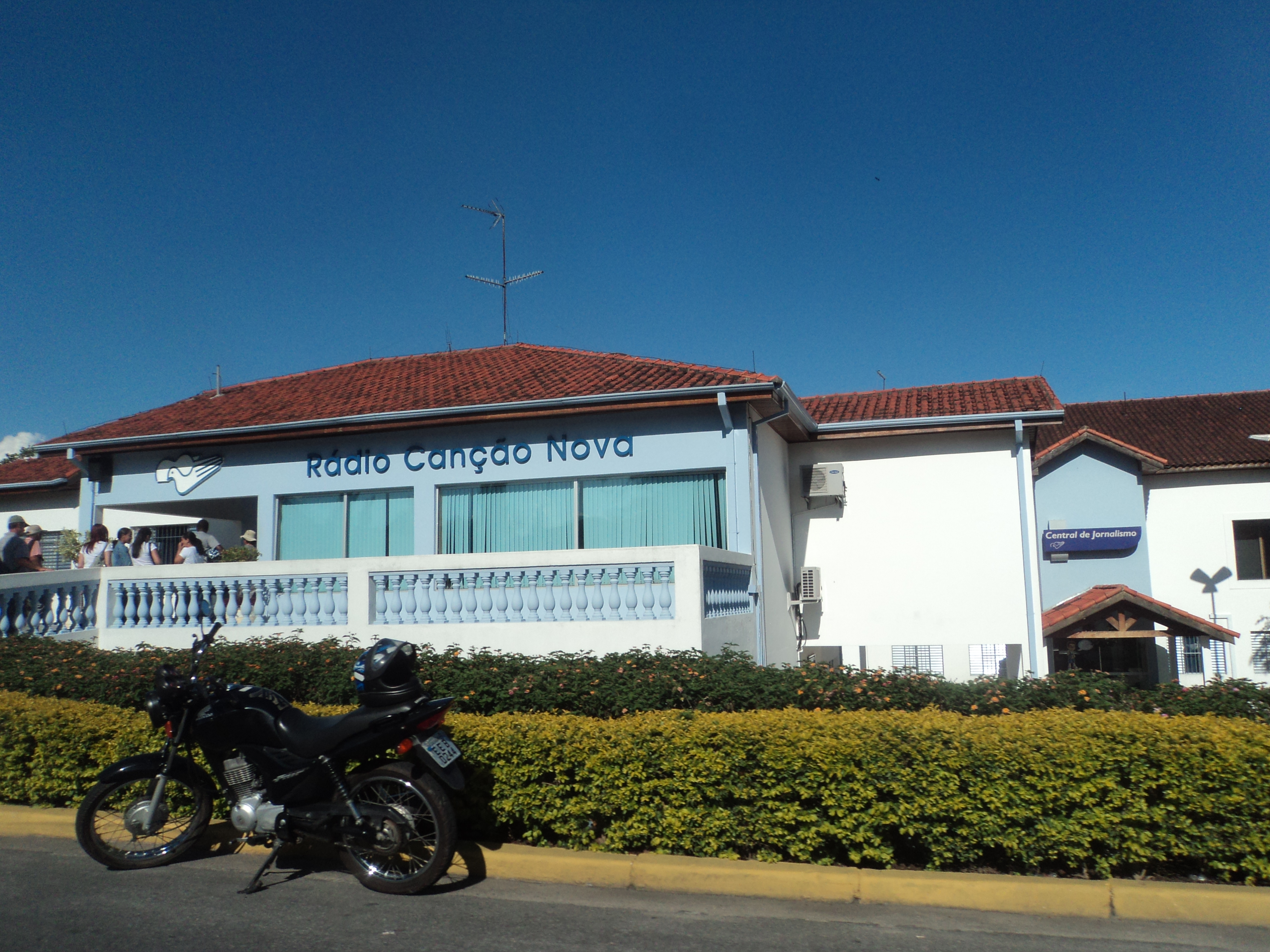
Inside Canção Nova

Cachoeira Paulista stands out for being the headquarters of the Canção Nova Community (Roman Catholic community) founded by Monsignor Jonas Abib and fellows in 1978.

They have a large structure with two event centers, confession rooms, Blessed Sacrament Chapel, sanctuary of the Father of Mercies, television, and radio studios.

"Hosanna, Brazil" is one of many celebrations held by the Canção Nova Community in mid-December, with church services, lectures and concerts. The city gets its hotels almost crowded during these periods.

The headquarters of Canção Nova also features a large TV studio where the programs shown by their issuer belonging to the institution are recorded.

Christianity is predominant in Cachoeira Paulista; the city is well divided between Evangelicals and Catholics.

== Media ==
In telecommunications, the city was served by Companhia de Telecomunicações do Estado de São Paulo until 1975, when it began to be served by Telecomunicações de São Paulo. In July 1998, this company was acquired by Telefónica, which adopted the Vivo brand in 2012.

The company is currently an operator of cell phones, fixed lines, internet (fiber optics/4G) and television (satellite and cable).

== See also ==
- List of municipalities in São Paulo
