= Catholic Charismatic Renewal =

Catholic charismatic movement

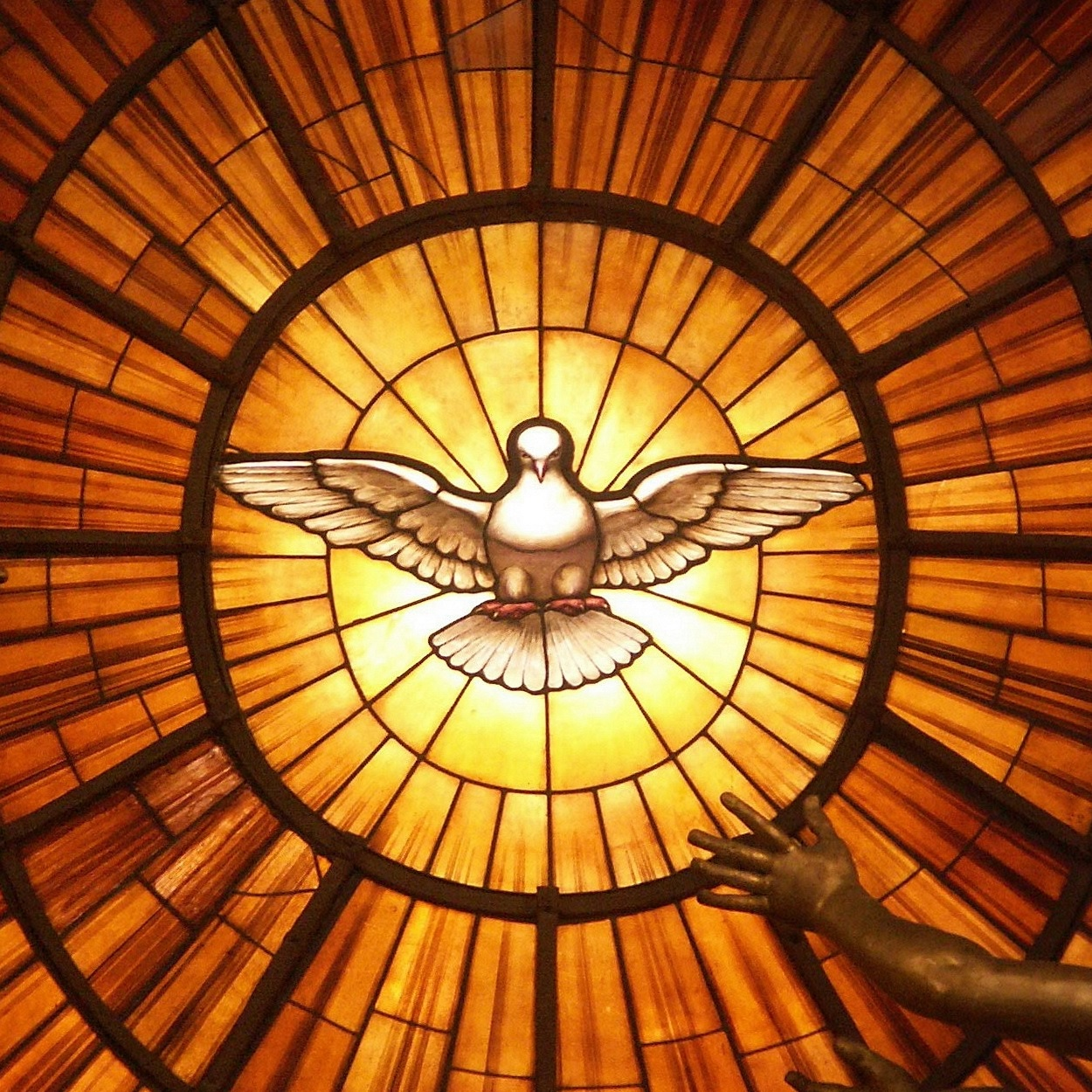
- Stained-glass window of a dove in Saint Peter's Basilica, symbolizing the Holy Spirit, who is believed by Christians to confer various gifts
- Formation: 1967
- Type: Catholic apostolic movement
- Headquarters: Vatican City
- Website: www.charis.international

The Catholic Charismatic Renewal (CCR) is a movement within the Catholic Church and part of the wider Charismatic movement that spread across various Christian denominations.

The Catholic Charismatic Renewal has been described as a "current of grace". It began in 1967 when Catholics from Duquesne University attended a Protestant worship service and claimed to have been "baptized in the Holy Spirit". It is heavily influenced by American Protestantism, especially Evangelicalism and Pentecostalism, emphasizing a "personal relationship with Jesus", deep emotional experiences, and expressing the "gifts of the Holy Spirit".

Cardinal Leo Joseph Suenens described the Catholic Charismatic Renewal as "not a specific Movement [...] it does not have founders, it is not homogeneous and it includes a great variety of realities; it is a current of grace, a renewing breath of the Spirit for all members of the Church, laity, religious, priests and bishops [...] One does not form part of the Renewal, rather, the Renewal becomes a part of us provided that we accept the grace it offers us.” According to the Preacher of the Papal Household, Cardinal Raniero Cantalamessa, "[Jesus Christ] is no longer just a set of theses and dogmas. [...] No longer just an object of worship and of remembrance but a living reality in the Spirit".

Catholics who practice charismatic worship usually hold prayer meetings outside of Mass that feature prophecies, faith healing, and glossolalia. According to Christian theologians Peter Hocken, Tony Richie, and Christopher Stephenson, the Catholic Charismatic Renewal is intrinsically ecumenical and has given rise to covenant communities with members from major Christian denominations who lead a "shared life based on baptism in the Holy Spirit".

== Theological foundations ==
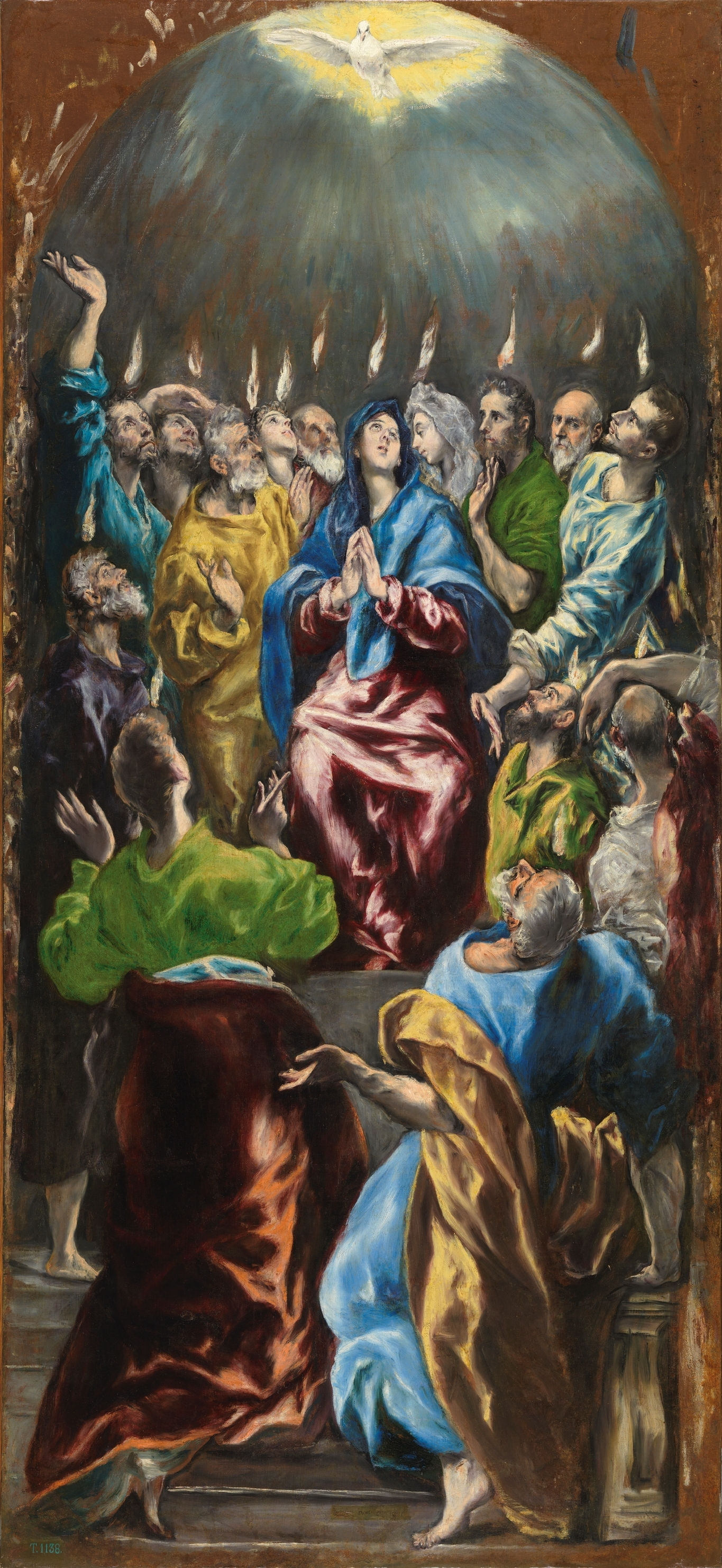
Pentecost by El Greco

Renewal advocates believe that the charisms identified in Saint Paul's writings, especially in Romans 12:6–8, 1 Corinthians 12–14, and Ephesians 4:11–12, continue to exist and build up the Church (see Catechism of the Catholic Church, §2003). The nine charismatic gifts considered extraordinary include: faith, expression of knowledge, expression of wisdom, miracles, speaking in tongues, interpretation of tongues, prophecy, discernment of spirits, and healing.(1 Corinthians 12:8–10) These gifts are related to the traditional seven gifts of the Holy Spirit described in Isaiah 11:1–2 (wisdom, understanding, counsel, fortitude, knowledge, piety, and fear of the Lord, as listed in Catechism of the Catholic Church, §1831). The nine charismatic gifts in 1 Corinthians 12:8–10 are also related to the spiritual and corporal works of mercy. Other references to charisms in the Catechism of the Catholic Church include §§688, 768, 799–801, 890, 951, 1508 (charism of healing) and 2035.

== History ==
=== Origins ===
In search of a spiritual experience, graduate student Ralph Keifer and history professor William Storey, both of the Catholic Duquesne University in Pittsburgh, attended a meeting of the Cursillo movement in August 1966. They were introduced to two books, The Cross and the Switchblade and They Speak with Other Tongues, which emphasized the Holy Spirit and the Spirit's charisms.

In February 1967, Storey and Keifer attended an Episcopalian prayer meeting and were baptized in the Holy Spirit. The following week, Keifer laid hands on other Duquesne professors, and they also had an experience with the Spirit. Then, in February, during a gathering of Duquesne University students at The Ark and The Dove Retreat Center north of Pittsburgh, more people asked Keifer to pray over them. This led to the event at the chapel where they too received the Holy Spirit and spoke in tongues, as did many other students present in the chapel. Keifer sent news of this event to the University of Notre Dame, where a similar event later occurred, and the Renewal began to spread.

While the Catholic hierarchy was initially reticent about these developments, Pope Paul VI officially welcomed Catholic charismatics in 1975.

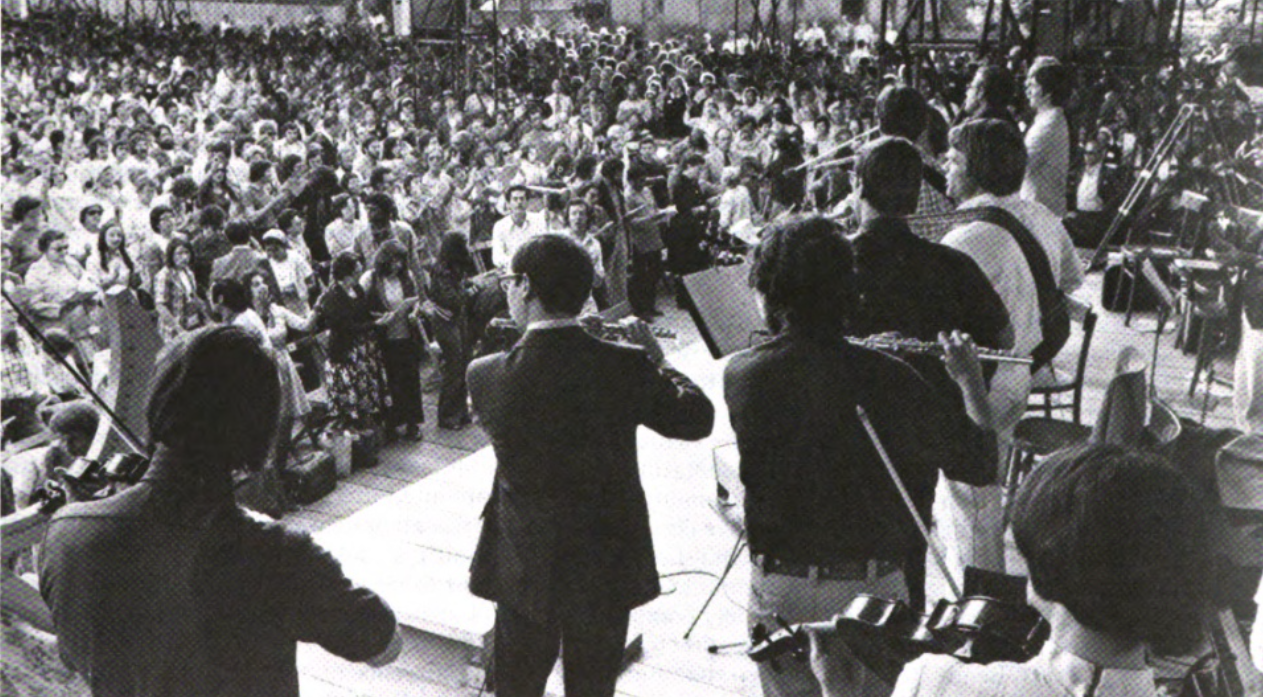
Word of God Music Group at Rome Conference in 1975

=== Expansion ===
Adherents of the movement formed prayer groups and covenant communities. In these communities, members practiced a stronger commitment to spiritual ideals and created documents, or covenants, that set up rules of life. One of the first structured covenant communities was the Word of God (1970) in Ann Arbor, Michigan and True House (1971) and the People of Praise (1971) in South Bend, Indiana. In 1982 a "community of communities" was formed called the Sword of the Spirit. A schism would eventually occur within the Word of God, where one of its founders remained president of the Sword of the Spirit and another founder stayed with the Word of God and founded the Catholic Fraternity of Charismatic Covenant Communities and Fellowships in 1990. Whereas the Sword of the Spirit is an ecumenical organization, the Catholic Fraternity is only for Catholic communities.

To facilitate communication between different expressions of charismatic renewal which were developing in the Catholic Church worldwide, the first International Communications Office (ICO) was established in Ann Arbor in 1972. Then in 1976 it was transferred to Malines-Brussels (Belgium), the diocese of Leo Joseph Suenens. He changed it to the International Catholic Charismatic Renewal Office (ICCRO) in 1978; this office transferred to Rome in 1981 and to the Vatican in 1985. In 1993 it was granted pontifical recognition and became International Catholic Charismatic Renewal Service (ICCRS), to emphasize its role as a pastoral ministry service to Catholic charismatic renewal worldwide.

In addition to the covenant communities and international offices, the Catholic charismatic renewal also experienced international development due to missionary priests who experienced the baptism of the Holy Spirit while visiting the United States and implemented their own such services when they returned home. The earliest international growth of Catholic charismatic renewal could be found in England from 1969 and in the early 1970s, amongst Catholics in Australia, India, Brazil, and Nigeria. The International Catholic Charismatic Renewal Services has had a significant role in the guidance of this form of expansion.

=== Today ===
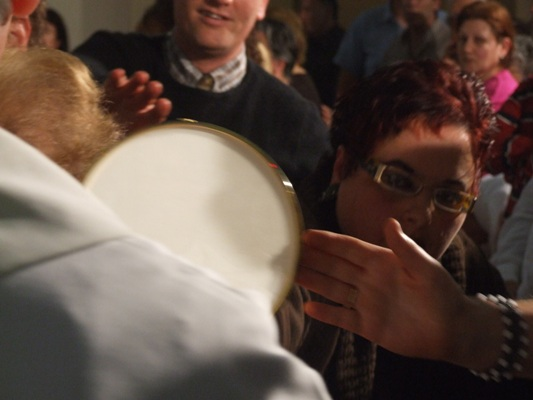
The Eucharist being elevated during a Catholic charismatic renewal healing service, in which the faithful not only pray for spiritual and physical healings, but also for miracles

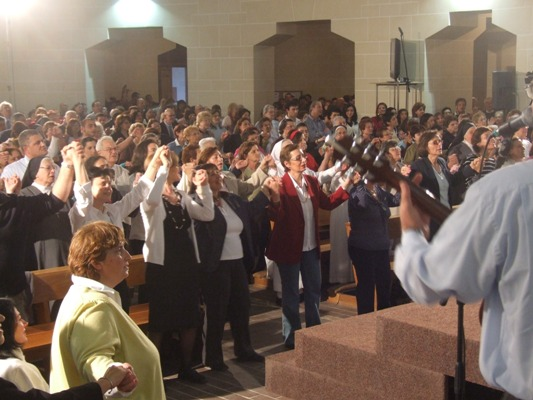
Praise and Worship during a CCR Healing Service

As of 2013, the Catholic charismatic renewal had over 160 million members. Participants in the Renewal also cooperate with non-Catholic ecclesiastical communities and other Catholics for ecumenism, as encouraged by Vatican II.

The charismatic element of the Church is seen as being evident today as it was in the early days of Christianity. Some Catholic charismatic communities conduct healing services, gospel power services, outreaches and evangelizations where the presence of the Holy Spirit is believed to be felt, and healings and miracles are said to take place. The mission of the Catholic charismatic renewal is to educate believers into the totality of the declaration of the gospels. This is done by a personal relationship with Jesus Christ; a one-to-one relationship with Jesus is seen as a possibility by the Charismatic. He is encouraged to talk to Jesus directly and search for what the Lord is saying so that his life will be one with Him; to walk in the fruit of the Spirit in Galatians 5:22–23; this is what the charismatic understands by giving their life to Jesus. Conscience is seen as an alternative voice of Jesus Christ.

==== CCR Golden Jubilee 2017 ====
In response to the invitation of Pope Francis, ICCRS and Catholic Fraternity organized together the Catholic charismatic renewal golden jubilee in 2017. The event began on May 31 and celebrations continued until Pentecost Mass on June 4.

== Ecumenical implications ==
Given that the Charismatic movement has spread across various Christian denominations, it carries implications with respect to advancing ecumenism. As the charismatic movement spread among Catholics, speakers from other Christian denominations have been invited to lecture at Catholic conferences. Leo Joseph Suenens, a Cardinal in the Catholic Church, led a study of charismatic renewal within the Catholic Church; its conclusion stated that "It is evident that the charismatic renewal is a major ecumenical force and is de facto ecumenical in nature." Ecumenical covenant communities arose within the Catholic charismatic movement with members from major Christian denominations (Catholic, Lutheran, Anglican, Reformed, etc.); notable examples include Word of God and People of Praise. Theologians Peter Hocken, Tony Richie, and Christopher A. Stephenson have written that these covenant communities demonstrate that "A shared life based on baptism in the Holy Spirit could and should be lived ecumenically."

== Baptism in the Holy Spirit ==
A central concept in charismatic renewal is the experience of "baptism in the Holy Spirit". This refers to an individual receiving a personal experience of the power of God, as the Apostles did at Pentecost and as believers did in the early Church when they were baptized and received prayer with laying on of hands, or simply hearing the good news of salvation. Catholic theologians McDonell and Montague conclude, from their study of the Christian Bible and early Christian writers, that "the baptism in the Spirit is integral to Christian initiation" and that "baptism in the Spirit is not special grace for some but common grace for all."

The Papal Preacher, Cardinal Raniero Cantalamessa, explains that "Catholic theology recognizes the concept of a valid but tied sacrament... if the fruit that should accompany it remains bound because of certain blocks that prevent its effectiveness." He goes on to say that sacraments are not magical rituals that act mechanically, without the person's knowledge or response, and that the individual's personal response and faith is needed in order for the grace and power of the sacraments to flow into their life.

== Reaction ==
=== From the Church hierarchy ===
The initial reaction to the movement by the hierarchy of the Catholic Church was cautiously supportive. Some initially supported it as a harbinger of ecumenism (greater unity of Gospel witness among the different Christian traditions), believing that these practices would draw the Catholic Church and Protestant communities closer together in a truly spiritual ecumenism. Today, the Catholic Charismatic Renewal enjoys support from most of the Catholic hierarchy, from the papacy to bishops of dioceses around the world, as a recognized ecclesial movement.

As of May 21, 2025, four popes have acknowledged the movement: Pope Paul VI, Pope John Paul II, Benedict XVI, and Pope Francis. Pope Paul VI acknowledged the movement in 1971 and reaffirmed it in 1975, adding that the movement brought vitality and joy to the Church, while also mentioning the need for people to be discerning of the spirits. Pope John Paul II was also supportive of the Catholic Charismatic Renewal and favored its conservative politics. He (as well as then-Cardinal Ratzinger, Pope Benedict XVI) acknowledged good aspects of the movement while urging caution, pointing out that members must maintain their Catholic identity and communion with the Catholic Church.

Pope John Paul II, in particular, made a number of statements on the movement. On November 30, 1990, the Pontifical Council for the Laity promulgated the decree which inaugurated the "Catholic Fraternity of Charismatic Covenant Communities and Fellowships". Brian Smith of Brisbane, elected President of the Executive of the Fraternity, called the declaration the most significant event in the history of the Catholic Charismatic Renewal since the 1975 Holy Year international conference and the acknowledgment it received from Pope Paul VI at that time, saying: "It is the first time that the Renewal has had formal, canonical recognition by the Vatican."

In March 1992, John Paul II stated:

At this moment in the Church's history, the Charismatic Renewal can play a significant role in promoting the much-needed defense of Christian life in societies where secularism and materialism have weakened many people's ability to respond to the Spirit and to discern God's loving call. Your contribution to the re-evangelization of society will be made in the first place by personal witness to the indwelling Spirit and by showing forth His presence through works of holiness and solidarity.

Moreover, during Pentecost 1998, John Paul II recognized the essential nature of the charismatic dimension:

The institutional and charismatic aspects are co-essential as it were to the Church’s constitution. They contribute, although differently, to the life, renewal and sanctification of God’s People. It is from this providential rediscovery of the Church’s charismatic dimension that, before and after the Council, a remarkable pattern of growth has been established for ecclesial movements and new communities."

The Papal Preacher, Cardinal Raniero Cantalamessa, has written on the topic of charismatic renewal within the Catholic Church numerous times since 1986.

Pope Francis spoke encouragingly about the Catholic Charismatic Renewal on many occasions. In June 2014, he said: "You, Charismatic Renewal, have received a great gift from the Lord. You were born of the will of the Spirit as a current of grace in the Church and for the Church." On June 8, 2019 he encouraged members of the Catholic Charismatic Renewal "to share baptism in the Holy Spirit with everyone in the Church."

=== Formation of CHARIS ===
On June 6, 2019, the CHARIS ("Catholic Charismatic Renewal International Service") service was officially inaugurated, ceasing the activities of the International Catholic Charismatic Renewal Services and the Catholic Fraternity (the two international organizations recognized by the Holy See that have provided the Renewal service worldwide so far).

The CHARIS service is subordinate to the Dicastery for the Laity, Family and Life. The purpose of CHARIS is to promote and strengthen communion among all expressions of Catholic Charismatic Renewal, as well as promoting and working for unity among all Christians. CHARIS has a "public juridic personality" within the Roman Catholic Church and has come into being as a direct initiative of Pope Francis.

The primary objectives of CHARIS are "To help deepen and promote the grace of baptism in the Holy Spirit throughout the Church and to promote the exercise of charisms not only in Catholic Charismatic Renewal but also in the whole Church."

=== Criticism ===
Charismatic Catholics and their practices have been criticized for distracting Catholics from authentic Church teachings and traditions, especially by making the worship experience more akin to the Pentecostal branch of Protestantism. According to Pentecostal pastor Samuel Rodriguez, Charismatic services in America simply help in increasing the number of Catholics converting to Pentecostal and evangelical denominations: “If you are involved in a Charismatic service today, in ten years’ time—inevitably—you are going to end up in one of my churches.” In particular, some traditionalists criticize charismatic Catholics as being crypto-Protestant.

Others criticize the movement for removing or obscuring traditional Catholic symbols, such as the crucifix and Sacred Heart, in favor of more contemporary expressions of faith. The belief that extraordinary spiritual gifts no longer operate in ordinary circumstances is called cessationism.

== See also ==
- Charismatic movement
- Charismatic Christianity
- Catholic charismatic renewal in Latin America
- Community of the Chemin Neuf
- Divine Retreat Centre, Muringoor
- Emmanuel Community
- Frank Hammond
- Jesus Youth
- Pentecostalism
- Prayer meeting
