= Education in South Bend, Indiana =

Education in South Bend, Indiana consists of public and private schools, ranging from pre-school to college and university.

== Higher education ==
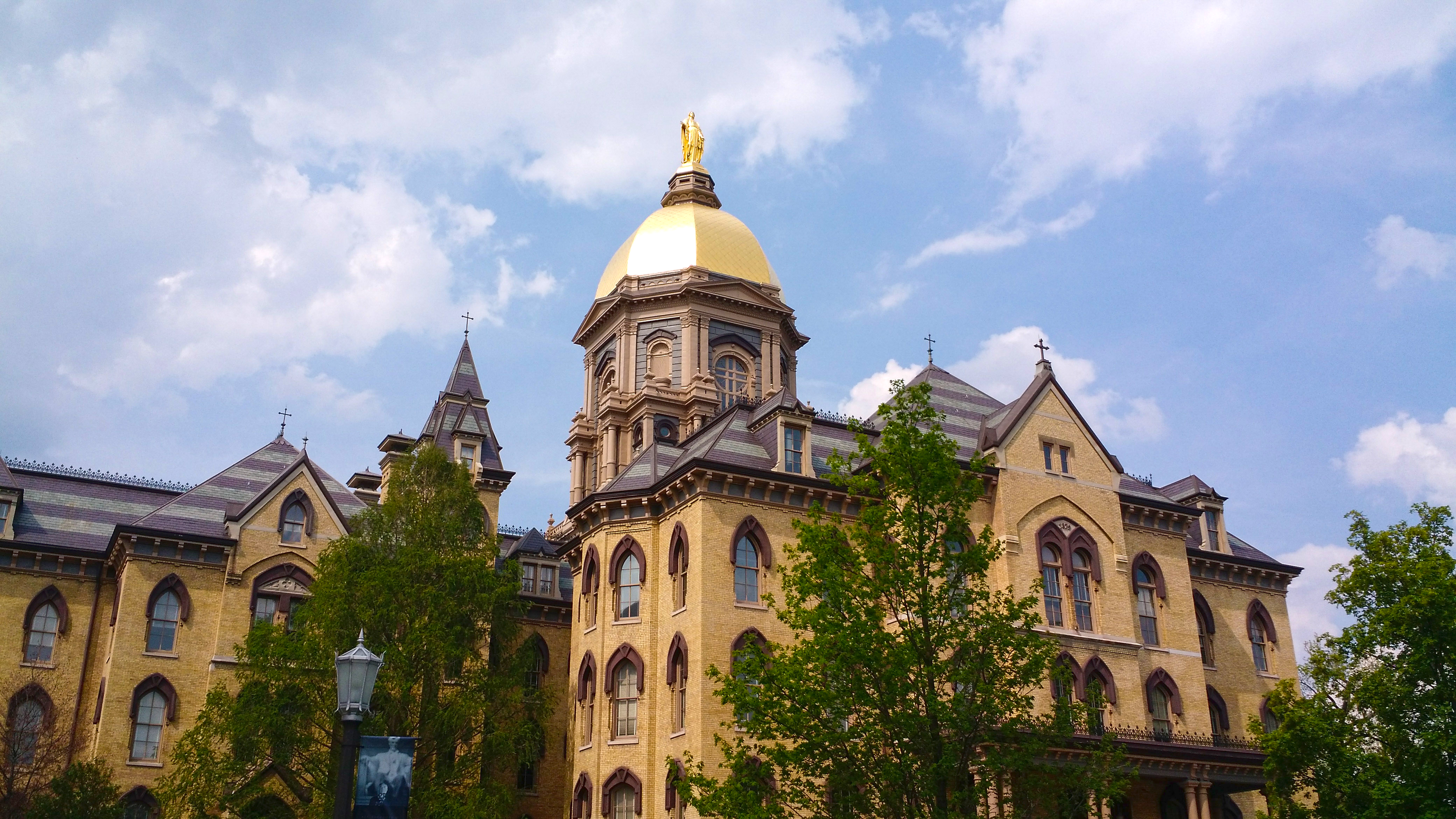
Main Building at University of Notre Dame

South Bend, Indiana is home to a variety of higher educational facilities including several full universities, as well as community and technical colleges.

The largest university in the South Bend area is the University of Notre Dame, founded in 1842. Nearby colleges include Saint Mary's College and Holy Cross College.

Indiana University South Bend is the third largest satellite campus in the Indiana University system.

Community and technical colleges include The Purdue Polytechnic Institute, Brown Mackie College, Ivy Tech Community College of Indiana, and ITT Technical Institute.

== Primary and secondary education ==
=== Public schools ===
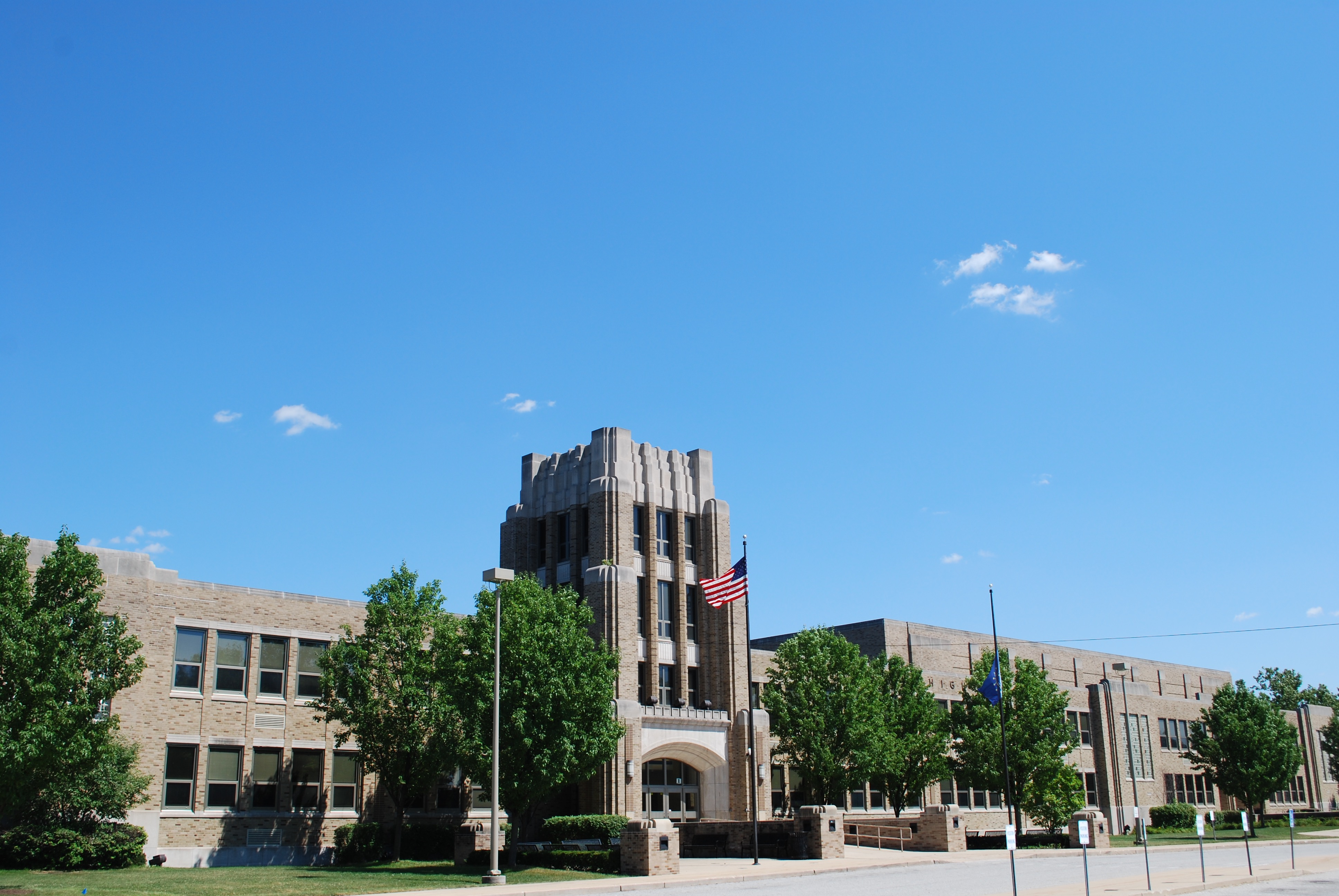
John Adams High School

Public schools in South Bend are operated by the South Bend Community School Corporation. The corporation runs 19 primary centers (K–4), ten intermediate centers (5–8), and four high schools. In 2014, the corporation served 19,308 students in grades K–12. The four high schools follow the magnet school model with focuses in different areas.

Public high schools
School	Grade levels	Enrollment (2014)	Focus
John Adams High School	9–12	1756	Global studies./pros. International Baccalaureate
Clay High School	9–12	1270	Visual and performing arts
James Whitcomb Riley High School	9–12	1140	Technology and engineering
Washington High School	9–12	1001	Medical/allied health sciences

=== Private schools ===
==== Roman Catholic ====
The Catholic Diocese of Fort Wayne-South Bend operates St. Joseph High School and eleven grade schools in South Bend. The Diocese also operates another high school and nine more grade schools in nearby areas.

Another parochial high school in the area is Marian High School in South Bend's twin city, Mishawaka.

Good Shepherd Montessori School is an independently established Catholic Montessori school for grades 1–8.

==== Jewish ====
South Bend Hebrew Day School offers Jewish and secular education for grades K–8 and preschool.

Yeshiva of South Bend is an all-male Orthodox Jewish high school and post-graduate school.

==== Other ====
Trinity School at Greenlawn is a Christian school for grades 7–12 and is part of Trinity Schools.

The Stanley Clark School is an independent school including grades K–8 and preschool.

Three local churches also accept children in grades K–6 at Michiana Christian School.

== Former schools ==
- Andrew Jackson High School was built in 1964 and opened in 1965, with the first graduation in 1967. It was located at 5001 South Miami Road at the corner of Jackson Road. It became Andrew Jackson Intermediate Center, a middle school, in 1975.
