= Wilberforce School =

Christian school in Mercer County, New Jersey, United States

The Wilberforce School

Location
- 75 Mapleton Road, Building Two; Princeton, Mercer County, New Jersey 08540; United States
- 40.358857°N 74.621425°W

Information
- Type: Private, Classical Christian
- Motto: Latin: Gratia et Veritas (Grace and Truth)
- Religious affiliation: Nondenominational Christianity
- Established: 8 September 2005
- Founders: David and Awilda Rowe, Howe and Brenda Whitman
- Sister school: Trinity Schools
- NCES School ID: A1101562
- Head of school: Howe Whitman Jr.
- Faculty: 19 FTEs
- Grades: PreK-12
- Enrollment: 344 (plus 13 in PreK, as of 2023–24)
- Average class size: 12
- Student to teacher ratio: 18.1:1
- Campus type: Suburban
- Colors: Blue and white
- Team name: Wolverines
- Accreditation: Middle States Association of Colleges and Schools
- Tuition: $30,970 (Upper School for 2025–26)
- Website: www.wilberforceschool.org

The Wilberforce School is a private, classical Christian school in Princeton, New Jersey, serving students in pre-kindergarten through twelfth grade. Founded in 2005, the school is named in honor of abolitionist William Wilberforce. The Head of School is Howe Whitman Jr.

The school has been accredited by the Middle States Association of Colleges and Schools Commission on Elementary and Secondary Schools since 2015; the school's accreditation expires in May 2022.

As of the 2023–24 school year, the school had an enrollment of 344 students (plus 13 in PreK) and 19 classroom teachers (on an FTE basis), for a student–teacher ratio of 18.1:1. The school's student body was 41.6% (143) White, 39.8% (137) Asian, 7.0% (24) Black, 5.8% (137) Hispanic and 5.8% (20) two or more races.

== History ==
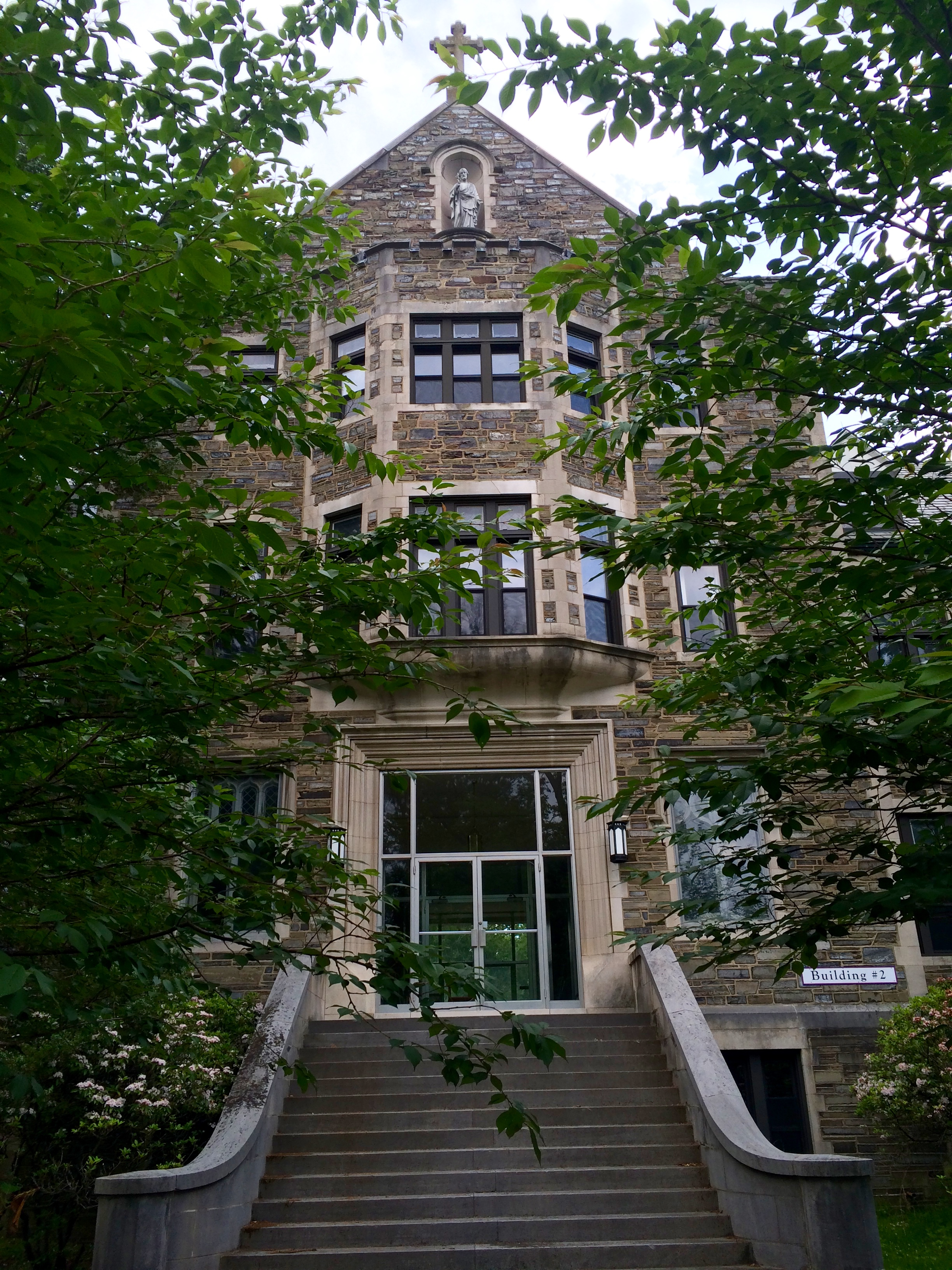
The main entrance to the Wilberforce School in building two of the former Saint Joseph's Seminary

=== Founding ===
The school opened in the fall of 2005 following two years of discussion between David and Awilda Rowe and Howe and Brenda Whitman concerning educational options for their children. Initially, the school met in the Lutheran Church of the Messiah on Nassau Street in Princeton Borough with classes for kindergarten through third grade. The first head of school was Sara Capps, who had served for eleven years at the West Dallas Community School.

In 2006, Karen Ristuccia, a graduate of Princeton University with a doctorate from Gordon-Conwell Theological Seminary, was named as principal. Ristuccia had served for seventeen years as the head of the Westerly Learning Center, an educational ministry of Stone Hill Church of Princeton. The growth of the school, with enrollment of 28, prompted a relocation to the Princeton Church of Christ in Princeton Township, with plans for an expansion up through sixth grade.

=== Expansion ===
Having expanded up through eighth grade and with an enrollment of 114, Wilberforce moved to its third home, the former Saint Joseph's Seminary, in 2011, as part of a consortium with the French-American School of Princeton and the American Boychoir School. The new 47 acres (19 ha) campus allowed for proper athletic facilities, separate wings for the middle and lower schools.

To launch a high school for the 2014–15 academic year, the school moved to new space in the Windsor Athletic Club in West Windsor, which provided an additional 22,000 square feet (2,000 m^{2}) of classroom space, room for 100 more students, and access to the club's saltwater pool and full-size basketball court. The club had initially been constructed as a Jewish community center but financial troubles caused that plan to fall through, allowing Wilberforce to move into newly finished school facilities. The upper school was launched in partnership with Trinity Schools, with Wilberforce becoming the first Trinity Member School, licensing the Trinity curriculum and receiving ongoing training from Trinity teachers.

In 2019 the school returned to the former Saint Joseph's Seminary with the renovation and long-term lease of the campus' main building.

== Academics ==
=== Student body ===
Wilberforce is located in the greater Princeton area. The student body is drawn from a 30-mile (48 km) radius, including students from Mercer, Middlesex and Somerset counties in New Jersey as well as Bucks County, Pennsylvania. The student body is 51% male and 49% female. Families are drawn from a variety of Christian denominations including Protestant, Coptic, Non-denominational, Orthodox, and Roman Catholic. Thirty percent of students receive financial aid. Wilberforce students have consistently ranked in the 95th percentile in math and 92nd in verbal compared to national norms. Admissions is competitive and students wear uniforms.

=== Educational philosophy ===
"The Wilberforce School was founded to provide a distinctly Christian education characterized by academic excellence and joyful discovery within a classical framework."

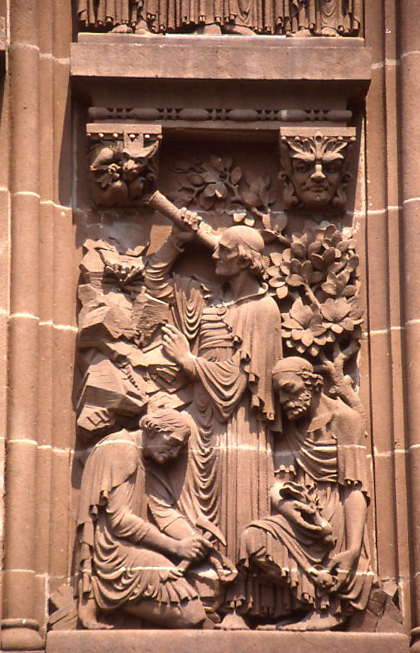
A sculpture depicting astronomy by J. Massey Rhind on the facade of Princeton University's Alexander Hall, part of a series depicting the various liberal arts that comprise a classical education

==== Classical framework ====
The school emphasizes Classical education, including the trivium, the teaching of the classics, and study of Latin. Wilberforce applies the trivium by arguing that each academic discipline has three elements: a grammar (set of rules and vocabulary), a logic (organizing principles), and a rhetoric (discourses and applications). Each topic is taught using these three components: the factual knowledge, its interpretation, and its implications. The trivium is also used by Wilberforce to describe the developmental stages of learning. The lower school students, with their aptitude for memorization, focus on the grammar stage; the middle school, with the increased capability for abstract thought, emphasizes the logic stage; and the upper school, with greater eagerness to write and debate, enter the rhetoric stage.

Wilberforce emphasizes "classic" works of art, literature, and history. The school defines a "classic" as "any work that every generation has read, studied, or cared about either because of its beauty and excellence or because of its influence and commentary on life." These works are memorized and recited in the grammar years, analyzed in the logic years, and debated in the rhetoric years.

The study of the Latin language begins in Class Three (third grade) and is considered by the school to be an important tool for a number of reasons, including furthering the training of an ordered mind, providing the basis for half the words in the English language, aiding in the study of other European languages, and enabling the reading of many classic works in the original language.

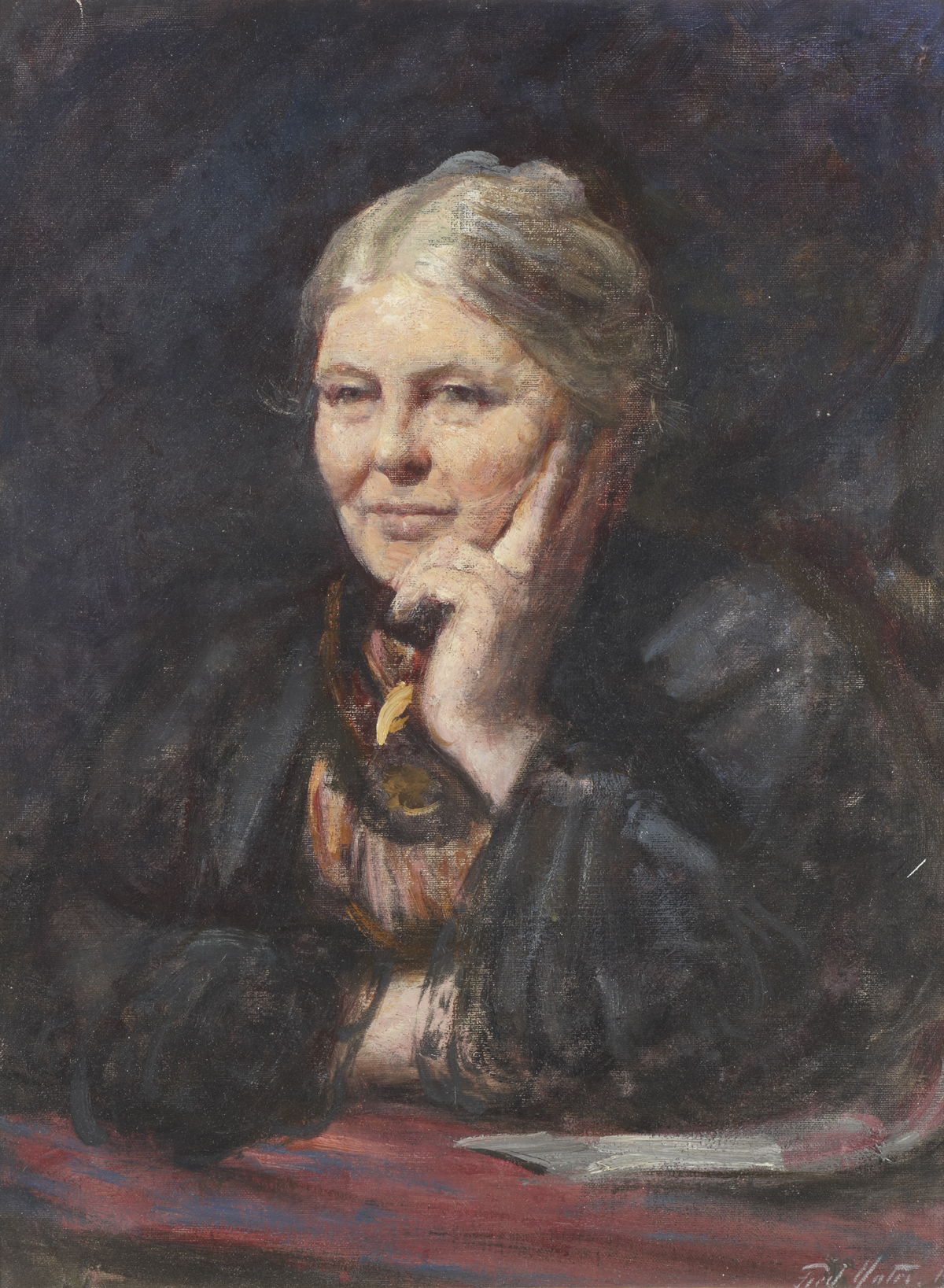
Frederic Yates, Charlotte Mason, 1902, Armitt Library

== Athletics ==
Wilberforce has access to the athletic facilities of the Windsor Athletic Club, with which it shares a building, including a saltwater pool. It competes with other area private and charter schools including Stuart Country Day School, Princeton Charter School, The Pennington School, and The Lawrenceville School. The coaching staff includes Olympic hopeful Rebeka Stowe, and among the student athletes was Acasio Pinheiro, the USA Track and Field New Jersey 2015 Junior Olympic Athlete of the Year.

Interscholastic sports offered include:

* Fall sports: Boys and Girls Soccer, Cross-Country, and Bowling

* Winter sports: Boys and Girls Basketball, Coed Swimming

* Spring sports: Boys and Girls Lacrosse, Coed Track

The girls' cross country team won the New Jersey State Interscholastic Athletic Association Non-Public Group B state title at the state group meet, the first state championship in the history of the program.
