= Trinity Academy (Portland, Oregon) =

Location
- 7424 North Mississippi Avenue; Portland, Oregon 97217; United States; 45°34′36″N 122°40′34″W

Information
- School type: Classical Christian
- Motto: Truth, Goodness, & Beauty
- Religious affiliation: Christian - Ecumenical
- Opened: 2011
- Sister school: Trinity Schools
- Head of school: Joannah Clark
- Student to teacher ratio: 1:10
- Campus type: Urban
- Affiliations: Trinity Schools
- Website: http://www.trinityacademyportland.org

Trinity Academy is a private classical Christian middle and high school located in north central Portland, Oregon The school was founded by Roman Catholic and Protestant Christians, though non-Christian students are welcome. Trinity Schools licenses the Trinity School Curriculum to Trinity Academy.

== History ==
Trinity Academy opened in 2011 with a ninth grade class of just five students. Trinity Academy was founded by a group of Roman Catholic and Protestant Christian teachers, families, and donors associated with the family of Trinity Schools and the People of Praise Christian community. Trinity Academy began operating at a facility owned by Northminster Presbyterian Church at 2823 N Rosa Parks Way in Portland, Oregon. In the summer of 2014, Trinity Academy relocated to a facility nearby to allow additional growth. The new location is at 7424 N Mississippi Ave., Portland, Oregon.

== Extracurricular activities ==
All Trinity students participate in the fine arts. Music theory, performance and choir are all integrated into the curriculum. Art history, drawing, painting, and calligraphy are also offered. Students partake in Trinity Academy's cross country and basketball teams, though they also participate in athletics at local public schools and private clubs. Trinity Academy started a media club in early 2013 offering students a creative platform to develop media skills in film, photography, social-media, and other related media platforms. Many of the students participate in summer service projects, such as the Compassion Connect sponsored Compassion North Portland at the local public Roosevelt High School. Students also have frequent field trips such as sailing on the Columbia and Willamette River as well as touring local farms and urban infrastructure projects integrated into the natural sciences program.
