= Saint Joseph's Seminary (Plainsboro, New Jersey) =

Coordinates: 40.35810°N 74.62120°W

St. Joseph's Preparatory Seminary
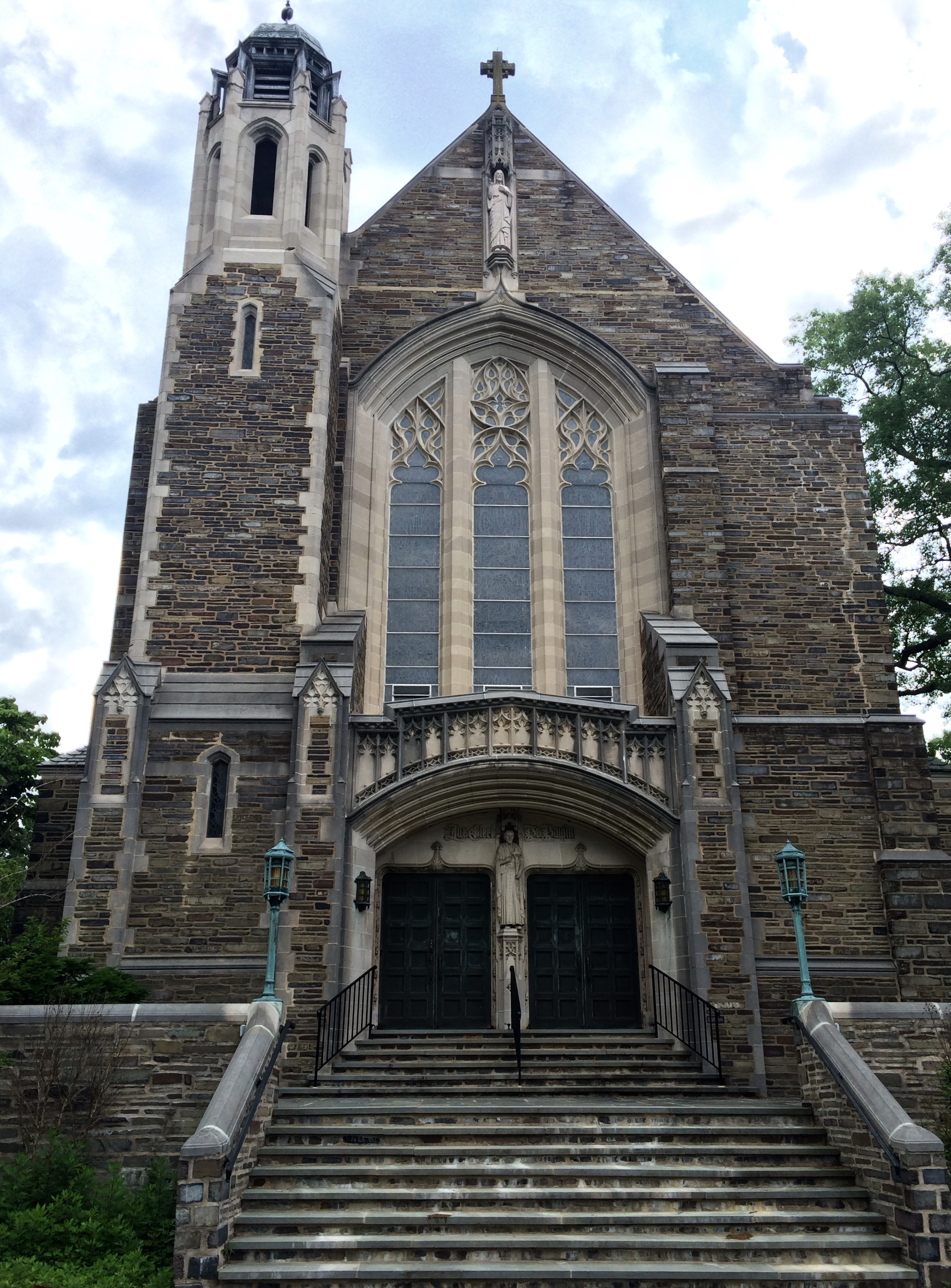
- The Seminary Chapel, home to stained glass windows by Nicola D'Ascenzo
- 75 Mapleton Road, Princeton, New Jersey

Information
- Type: Catholic Theological Seminary
- Opened: 1914
- Closed: 1992
- Campus size: 87 acres (35 ha)

Saint Joseph's Seminary was an American Catholic educational institution located in Plainsboro, New Jersey, though with an address in Princeton, New Jersey. It was founded in 1914 and was operated by the Congregation of the Mission, better known as the Vincentians, for the formation of their members and other candidates to the Catholic priesthood. The school closed in 1992 and a retreat center occupied the site until 2009.

The Mother of God Orthodox Church occupied a small portion of the seminary until 2015, when the American Boychoir School relocated there. The site is now home to private schools, but the Chapel of the Miraculous Medal is now home to the Princeton Abbey and Cemetery, a public cemetery and event space.

== Marillac Campus ==
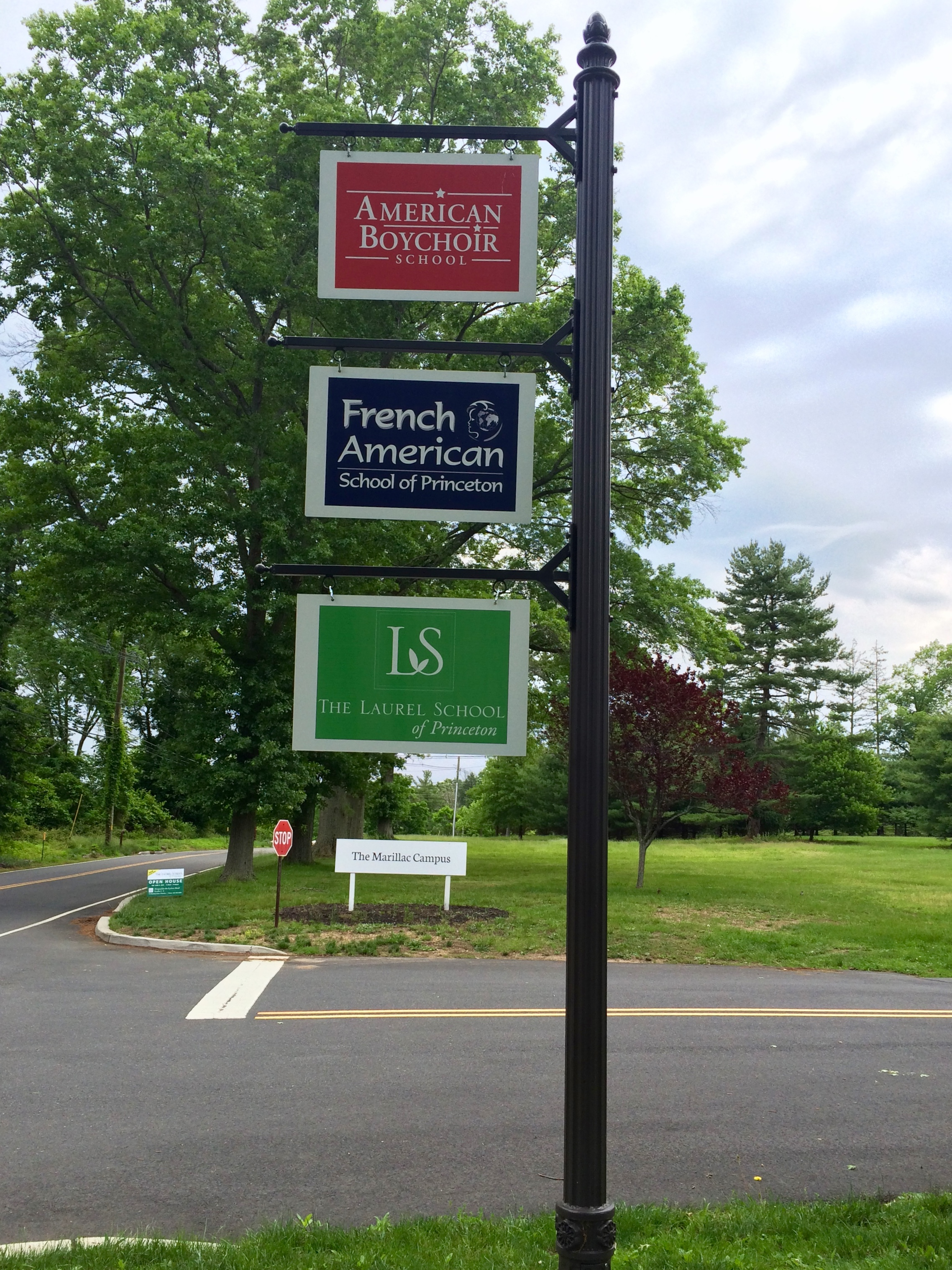
The former seminary is now home to a number of private schools

The complex is currently referred to as the Marillac Campus, after Saint Louise de Marillac, and the Vincentians rent space to a number of private schools, including the Wilberforce School, a Classical Christian school, the French American School of Princeton, and the Laurel School. The campus was also formerly home to the American Boychoir School which has since closed.

== Notable alumni ==
- The Very Rev. Joseph L. Levesque, C.M., President of St. John's University, Queens, New York
- The Very Rev. Joseph T. Cahill, C.M., President of St. John's University, Queens, New York

== Gallery ==
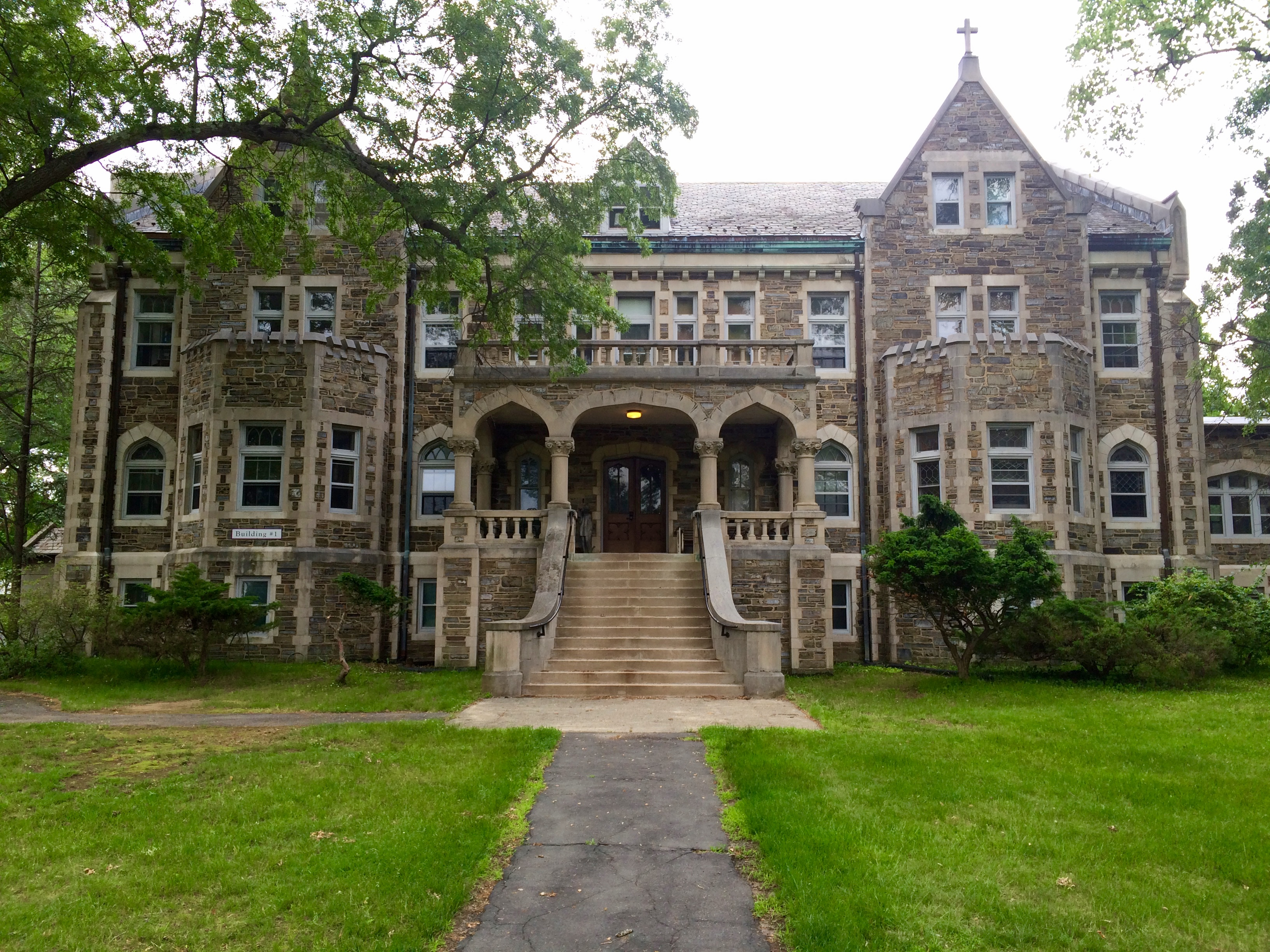
building one, home to the Laurel School

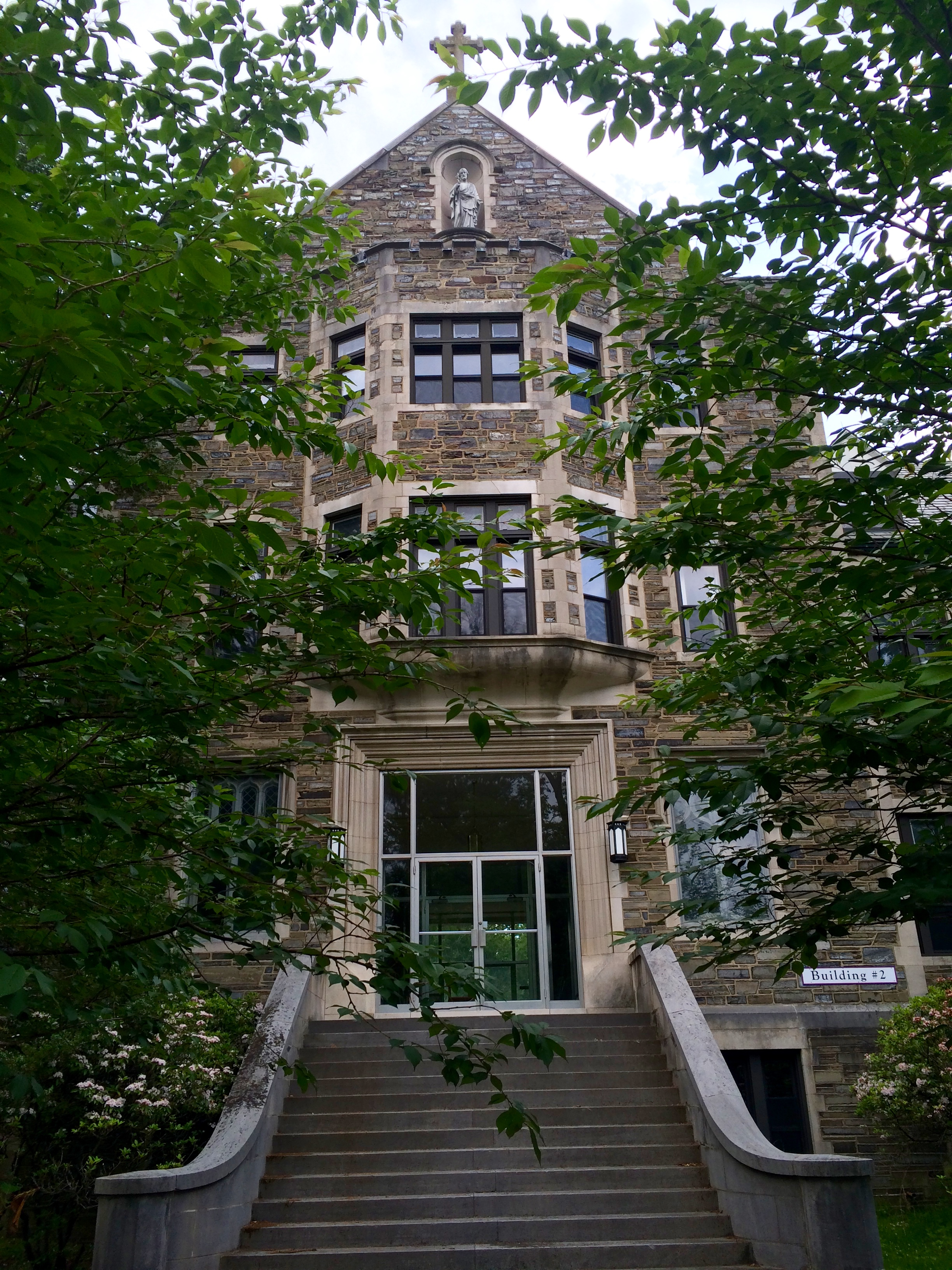
building two, home to the Wilberforce School

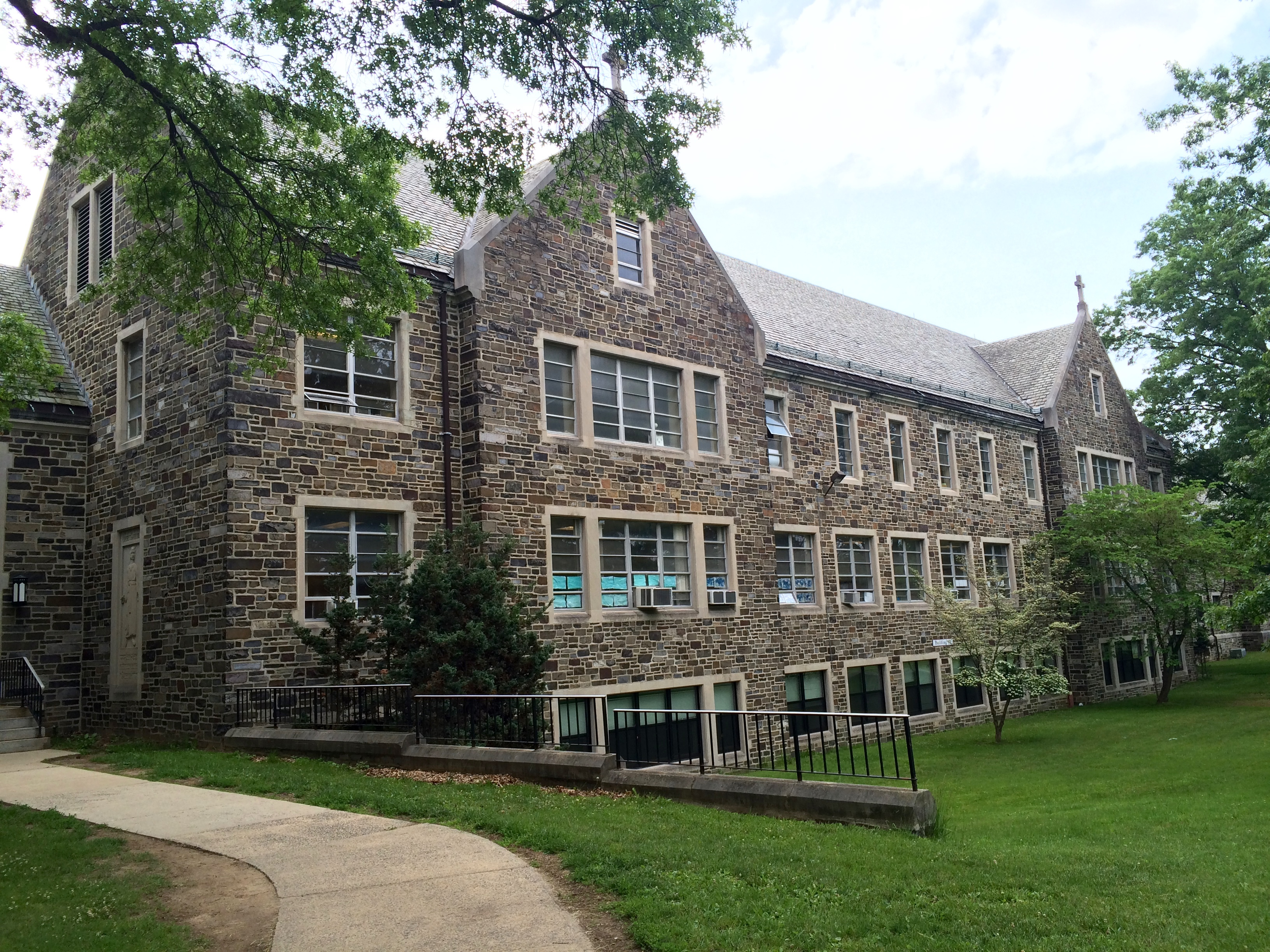
building four, home to the French-American School and The Laurel School

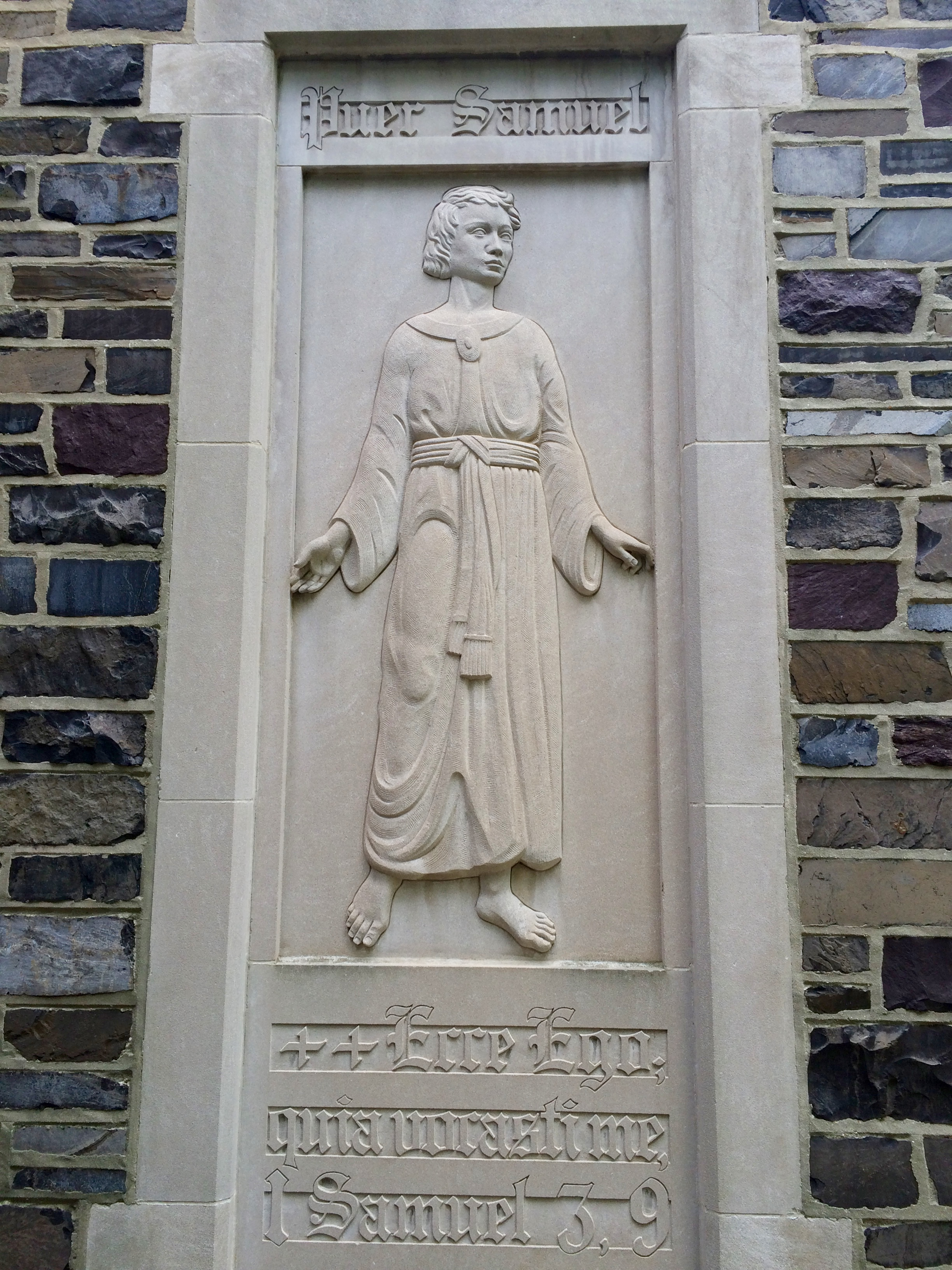
Relief of Samuel as a boy, on the 1960 addition

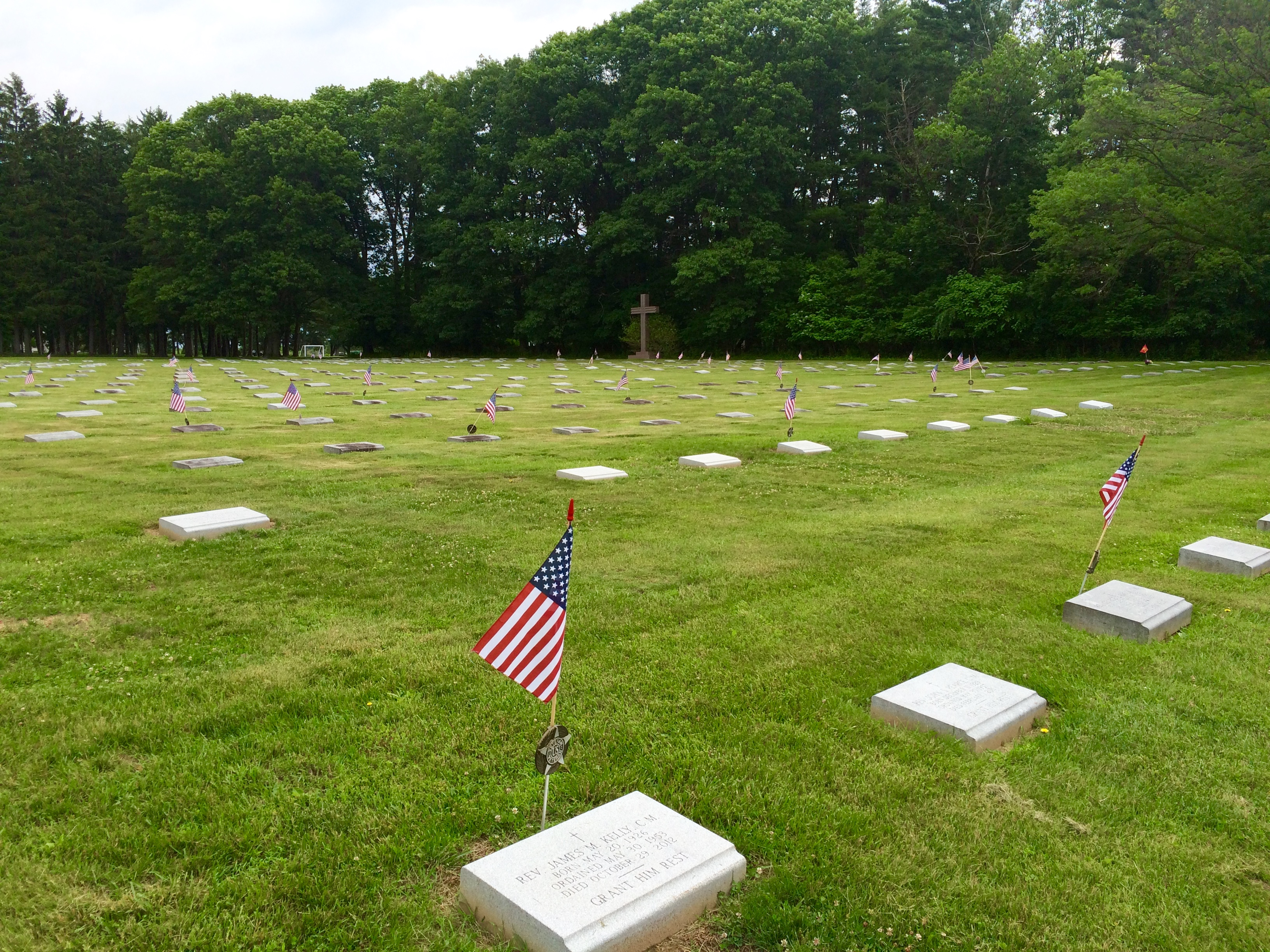
Cemetery for Vincentian fathers
