= Trinity School at River Ridge =

Location
- 601 River Ridge Parkway; Eagan, Minnesota 55121; United States; 44°51′36″N 93°6′28″W

Information
- Type: Private Christian
- Motto: Verum, Bonum, Pulchrum
- Established: 1987
- CEEB code: 241688
- Head of school: Beth Schmitz
- Faculty: ~ 35
- Enrollment: ~ 170
- Colors: Royal Blue and White
- Mascot: Tri-Hawks
- Website: https://trinityriverridge.org/

Trinity School at River Ridge is a private Christian school in Eagan, Minnesota, United States. It provides an education rooted in classical Christian education to students in grades 6-12. The school is located at 601 River Ridge Parkway, Suite 200, in Eagan, Minnesota 55121. This 1996, 2008, and 2019 Blue Ribbon school is accredited by North Central Association and Independent School Association of the Central States (NCA/ISACS).

The River Ridge campus was founded in 1987 by the People of Praise, a Christian community. It is owned and operated by Trinity Schools, Inc, based in South Bend, Indiana. The River Ridge campus has two sister schools, Greenlawn in South Bend and Meadow View in Falls Church, Virginia.

== History ==
River Ridge, the second campus of Trinity Schools, Inc., opened in the Twin Cities in 1987 with 6 teachers and 31 students, using rented facilities at Gethsemane Episcopal Church, in downtown Minneapolis. Dan Ferris served as head of school. In 1991 the school moved to Bloomington, after purchasing a building (itself a former school) from Control Data Corporation. By 1991, when William Wacker became headmaster, the school had grown to 112 students and 18 teachers. The school expanded to two sections of boys and two of girls in 1995, starting with grade 7.

In 2005, runway expansion at the Minneapolis-Saint Paul International Airport resulted in noise levels greater than 65 decibels on the River Ridge campus in Bloomington. The Metropolitan Airports Commission offered a grant to Trinity School of approximately $7M either to install soundproofing or to help in a move to a new location. Trinity School accepted the grant and selected a new site in Eagan, a nearby suburb, near the intersection of Argenta Trail and Interstate 494. The board of governors of the People of Praise authorized a fund-raising campaign and approved a construction plan for the new campus, which included offices, classrooms, science labs, a commons area, a two-station gym and soccer field. Groundbreaking at the new site occurred at ceremonies on October 19, 2006. The school moved to the Eagan campus in December 2007, as scheduled.

Jon Balsbaugh became head of school in 2009. In 2017, he succeeded Kerry Koller as President of Trinity Schools, Inc. The school added a 6th grade in 2016.

== General information ==
Trinity School at River Ridge is ranked in the top 10 for private schools in Minnesota and in the top 3 for Christian schools in Minnesota.

The school aims to create a cohesive culture that includes all members of the faculty, staff, students, and parents.

== Administration ==
John Stauble is the Head of the School.
