= Douglas Ahlstedt =

American operatic tenor (1945–2023)

- Ahlstedt, c. 1995
- Born: March 16, 1945; Jamestown, New York, U.S.
- Died: November 24, 2023 (aged 78)
- Education: State University of New York at Fredonia; Eastman School of Music
- Occupations: Operatic tenor; Academic teacher
- Organizations: Metropolitan Opera; Deutsche Oper am Rhein; Carnegie Mellon University
- Awards: Metropolitan Opera National Council Auditions

Douglas Ahlstedt (March 16, 1945 – November 24, 2023) was an American operatic tenor who had an international performance career with major opera houses from the 1970s through the 1990s. He was a member of the Metropolitan Opera and of the Deutsche Oper am Rhein, performing leading roles of the lyric tenore repertoire, and also many supporting roles. He was professor of voice at Carnegie Mellon University from 1998 until 2020.

== Early life ==
Douglas Ahlstedt was born in Jamestown, New York, on March 16, 1945 to Carl and Pearl Ahlstedt. He attended and performed with the American Boychoir School in Princeton, New Jersey, in his youth. He sang in his first opera while still a child, portraying the role of Miles in the United States premiere of Britten's The Turn of the Screw with the New York College of Music in 1958. He earned a bachelor's degree in vocal performance from the State University of New York at Fredonia in 1968, and then served in the Army in Okinawa for two years. He completed studies of vocal performance at the Eastman School of Music with a master's degree.

== Career ==
Ahlstedt made his stage debut as Ramiro in Rossini's La Cenerentola at the Western Opera Theater in San Francisco in 1971. He first appeared with the San Francisco Opera as Koby in the United States premiere of Gottfried von Einem's Der Besuch der alten Dame. That same year he made his debut at the Tanglewood Music Festival as the Boy in Ian Strasfogel's production of Brecht and Weill's The Yes Man, and was also heard at Tanglewood that year as Soldato pretoriano in Monteverdi's L'incoronazione di Poppea.

=== United States ===
In 1973 Ahlstedt won the Metropolitan Opera National Council Auditions which made him known. He made his debut on the stage of the Metropolitan Opera (Met) in September 1973 as Borsa in Verdi's Rigoletto with Louis Quilico in the title role. In the same season, he performed there as the Italian Tenor in Der Rosenkavalier by R. Strauss. He appeared at the Met in multiple roles, both leading and minor, over the next three seasons, including Fenton in Verdi's Falstaff, Benvolio in Gounod's Roméo et Juliette, Brighella in Ariadne auf Naxos by Richard Strauss, Count Almaviva in Rossini's The Barber of Seville, Danieli in Verdi's I vespri siciliani, Edmondo in Puccini's Manon Lescaut, the First Prisoner in Beethoven's Fidelio, Froh in Wagner's Das Rheingold, Gastone in Verdi's La traviata, Lindoro in Rossini's L'italiana in Algeri, the Lover in Puccini's Il tabarro, Major-domo in Der Rosenkavalier, Nathanael in Offenbach's The Tales of Hoffmann, a Priest in Mozart's The Magic Flute, the Sailor's Voice in Wagner's Tristan und Isolde, and the Third Esquire in Parsifal.

In 1973, Ahlstedt appeared on the TV game show To Tell the Truth (episode 1643).

=== International career ===
From 1975 until 1984, Ahlstedt was a member of the ensemble of the Deutsche Oper am Rhein in Germany, followed by the Vienna State Opera. He had guest contracts with the Opernhaus Zürich (1980–1981), the Hamburg State Opera (1982–1984), and the Badisches Staatstheater Karlsruhe (1984–1987). He made guest appearances, at the Holland Festival as Rinuccio in Puccini's Gianni Schicchi in 1977, the Grand Théâtre de Genève in 1978, the Dutch National Opera (1979) and the Grand Théâtre de Bordeaux in 1981. He appeared at the Teatro dell'Opera di Roma as Idreno in Rossini's Semiramide in 1982, at the Opéra d'Avignon in 1983, at the National Theatre Prague 1987, and at the Teatro di San Carlo in Naples as Oreste in Rossini's Hermione in 1988. He performed at the Bavarian State Opera as Sifare in Mozart's Mitridate and as Alessandro in Mozart's Il re pastore, both in 1990, and at the Stuttgart State Opera as Dorvil in Rossini's La scala di seta in 1991, among others. He also performed at the 1985 and 1987 Salzburg Festival as Anfinomo in Monteverdi's Il ritorno d'Ulisse in patria.

In 1979 Ahlstedt made his debut at the Opera Company of Philadelphia as Ramiro in La Cenerentola, with Maria Ewing in the title role. He also made guest appearances at the Florentine Opera in Milwaukee in 1976 and the Dallas Opera in 1987. He appeared at the Municipal Theatre of Santiago in 1985 and again in 1987 as Don Ottavio in Mozart's Don Giovanni, and the Municipal Theater of Rio de Janeiro in 1989.

In 1983 Ahlstedt returned to New York City to sing as Idreno in a concert version of Rossini's Semiramide at Avery Fisher Hall presented by the American Symphony Orchestra with June Anderson in the title role, Marilyn Horne as Arsace, and Samuel Ramey as Assur. From 1983, he appeared at the Met again, as Iopas in Les Troyens by Berlioz. He appeared in several more operas at the Met over the next five years, including as Count Almaviva, Fenton, Lindoro, and the title role in Debussy's Pelléas et Mélisande. After 191 performances at the Met, his final appearance there was on April 14, 1988, as Ferrando in Così fan tutte.

=== Teaching ===
From 1998, Ahlstedt was professor of voice at the Carnegie Mellon University; he retired in 2020. During his time there, he founded and directed the Steelers Opera Chorus, and he continued singing in concerts.

== Personal life ==
Ahlstedt married Linda Foxx on February 1, 1969; they worked together for the Anglican Church of Okinawa as choir director and organist. They had three children.

Ahlstedt died on November 24, 2023, at the age of 78.
