= Herbert Huffman =

American choral director (1905–1968)

- Born: January 27, 1905; Plain City, Ohio
- Died: June 14, 1968 (aged 63); Delaware, Ohio (from The Delaware Gazette)
- Occupation(s): Musician, choir director, educator, businessman
- Spouse(s): Mary Christine Southard (1929–1968) (his death)
- Children: Richard Huffman (1932–1982); Mary Jane (Huffman) Haas (1934–1987); Robert Huffman (1939–1989)

Herbert Brown Huffman (1905–1968) was a prominent American choral director during the mid 20th century who founded the Columbus Boychoir School, now the American Boychoir School. For over 75 years, this internationally acclaimed choral group has performed in venues across the United States and in overseas locations.

== Early life ==
Huffman was born on January 27, 1905, in Plain City, Union County, Ohio. Plain City, founded in 1818, is a town of modest size located on the western bank of Big Darby Creek. Huffman's parents were Hamer Isaac Huffman (1868–1950) and Cora Louise Brown (1869–1917), both Ohio natives. Hamer Issac was a dry goods merchant by trade.

Huffman was the youngest of three brothers. Older brothers, Isaac Lloyd and Isaac Boyd, were twins. They were 14 years old at the time of Huffman's birth. Huffman's mother died of uncertain cause when he was 11 years old. His father took a second wife, Ella Car, two years later.

Huffman attended Westminster Choir College, and was a member of the first graduating class in 1929. This residential music college, founded in 1926, was originally located in Dayton, Ohio. It then moved to Ithaca, New York, before permanently establishing itself at Princeton, New Jersey. Graduates of the Westminster Choir College, who are sometimes referred to as "Ministers of Music", include a large number of notable composers, musical directors, and musicians.

== Family ==
On February 4, 1929, at age 24, Huffman married Mary Christine Southard at Westminster Presbyterian Church, the church sponsoring and operating the Choir College prior to its ultimate move to Princeton, in Dayton, Ohio. Southard, a native of Marysville, Ohio, was 23 years of age at the time. She was an organist, pianist, and music teacher. The couple had three children, Richard, born on March 9, 1932, Mary Jane, born on December 13, 1934, and Robert, born on May 10, 1939. After arriving in Columbus, Ohio, the Huffmans occupied various rental addresses, before settling in a house in Bexley, just east of Columbus.

== Career ==
As a choral director, Huffman's career spanned a relatively short 27 years. However, during that period, Huffman staged hundreds of performances that were well received by critics and he created musical ensembles which have endured to the present.

=== Early involvement with choral music ===
In Columbus, Huffman was employed as a choir director for several churches, including the King Avenue Methodist Church. Under his direction, the choir of that church won first prize in 1930 and 1931 at the National Eisteddfod, at Jackson, Ohio. A choir directed by Huffman also competed successfully against 76 other choirs by winning the Talbot Cup at the annual festival of the Westminster Choirs at Ithaca, New York. In 1934, Huffman was hired as director of music at the Broad Street Presbyterian Church in Columbus. There, he founded the Broadstreet Choir, which is still in existence.

=== Columbus Boychoir School ===
In 1937, Huffman began efforts to establish a choir for local boys. The organization was founded as a part-time singing group. Huffman conducted auditions with his wife, Mary Christine, who accompanied applicants on the piano. The choir began to enjoy considerable success on the local level and was invited to perform in neighboring towns. Huffman indicated that the mission of the Columbus Boychoir would be to build character in young boys, to provide exceptional training without regard to religious affiliation or financial circumstance, to provide incentive for academic achievement, and to enrich cultural life through a "musical organization that is recognized throughout the country as the finest of its kind."

By 1940, Huffman had transformed the Columbus Boychoir into a fully accredited day school with overnight lodging, which served as the base for the traveling choir. The Columbus Boychoir School initially occupied a property owned by the Broad Street Presbyterian Church on East Broad Street in Columbus. As it toured, the choir, popularly known as "America's Singing Boys", began to receive recognition that transcended its status as a local organization. Radio performances provided considerable publicity. By the mid-1940s, in keeping with Huffman's vision, the choir had become a national institution.

Huffman directed the group's musical performances on several recordings made during the late 1940s and early 1950s. These included a 1947 production titled "Favorite Christmas Carols". In 1950, Huffman directed the choir in its performance on the RCA Victor recording of "The Lord's Prayer; O Holy Night". In 1954, the Columbus Boychoir teamed with the NBC Symphony Orchestra on the RCA production "Arrigo Boito Mephistofele Prologue". The final recording in which Huffman acted as choir director was the Decca record, "Festival of Song" in 1955. Huffman was also responsible for directing performances in the 1951 NBC telecast of Amahl and the Night Visitors. His work was featured in the RKO motion picture liner "America's Singing Boys".

In September, 1950, Huffman cast the deciding vote when the board of directors of the boychoir school resolved to move its headquarters from Columbus, Ohio, to Princeton, New Jersey. The Princeton area, centrally located among the major metropolitan areas of the east coast, meant that several prestigious venues were only a short bus ride away. According to one source regarding Princeton:

Two local schools are renowned for music studies. The Westminster Choir was founded by John Finley Williamson in Dayton, Ohio, in 1926 and moved three years later to Ithaca, New York. It came to Princeton in 1932, added graduate course, and in 1939 became Westminster Choir College. (Today, it remains located in Princeton but is part of Lawrence Township-based Rider University.) Another leading music center came to the area when Williamson persuaded protégé Herbert Huffman to move Huffman's boychoir school from Columbus, Ohio to Princeton. In 1950, the school acquired Albemarle, the Princeton estate of Gerald Lambert (manufacturer of Listerine-brand mouthwash), as its new home. Renamed the American Boychoir School in 1980, its student choir tours America and the World to great acclaim.

At Princeton, the choir became affiliated with Huffman's alma mater, the Westminster Choir College. Physicist Albert Einstein and his wife attended rehearsals and concerts and sometimes interacted with the students. While on tour during this period, the boys traveled on a customized bus, outfitted with school desks and a piano. In 1956, Huffman stepped aside as director of the Columbus Boychoir in order to pursue business opportunities. He nevertheless remained closely associated with the organization for the remainder of his life.

=== Later business activities ===
In the late 1950s, Huffman established three McDonald's restaurant franchises in Columbus, Ohio. In 1965 or 1966, Huffman sold these operations and moved with his wife, children, and grandchildren to Palm Beach Gardens, Florida. There, he continued his endeavors in the fast food business and invested in real estate.

== Death ==
Herbert Huffman died suddenly on June 13, 1968, in Palm Beach County, Florida. His funeral was held in Marysville, Union County, Ohio. His widow, Mary Christine, continued to reside in Palm Beach County, Florida, until her death on November 21, 2002, at 96 years of age.

== Legacy ==
Huffman's primary legacy, the Columbus Boychoir School continued to thrive in the period immediately following his resignation and through his date of death. In 1980, it was renamed the American Boychoir School. Following a period of financial difficulties and declining enrolment, the school closed in 2017.
