= Trinity School at Meadow View =

Coordinates: 38°52′26″N 77°12′25″W

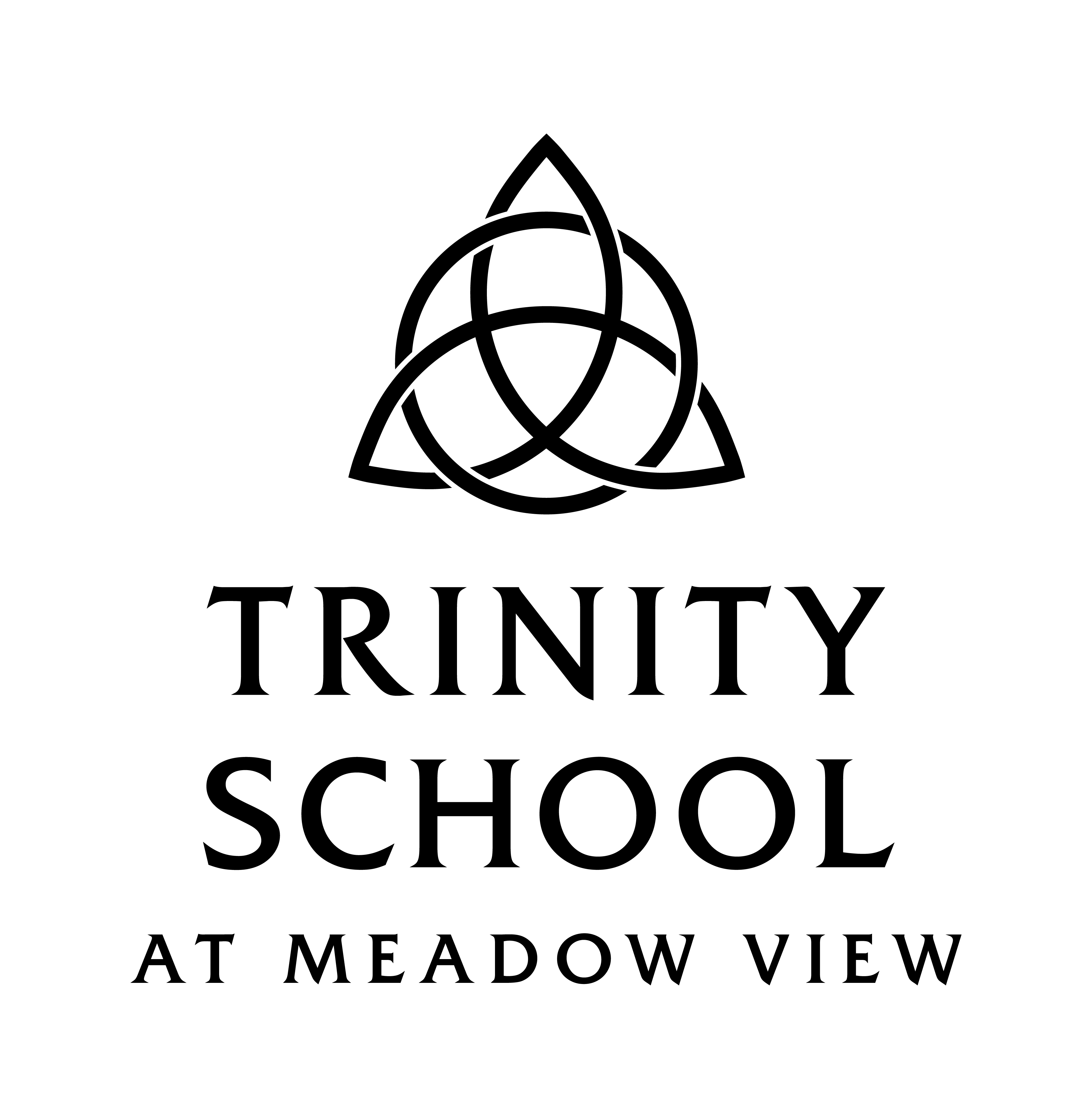
- 2849 Meadow View Road, Falls Church, VA 22042

Information
- School type: Private Christian
- Motto: Verum, Bonum, Pulchrum
- Established: 1998
- Head of school: Tim Maloney (interim)
- Faculty: 23
- Grades: 7-12
- Team name: Tempest
- Website: https://trinitymeadowview.org/

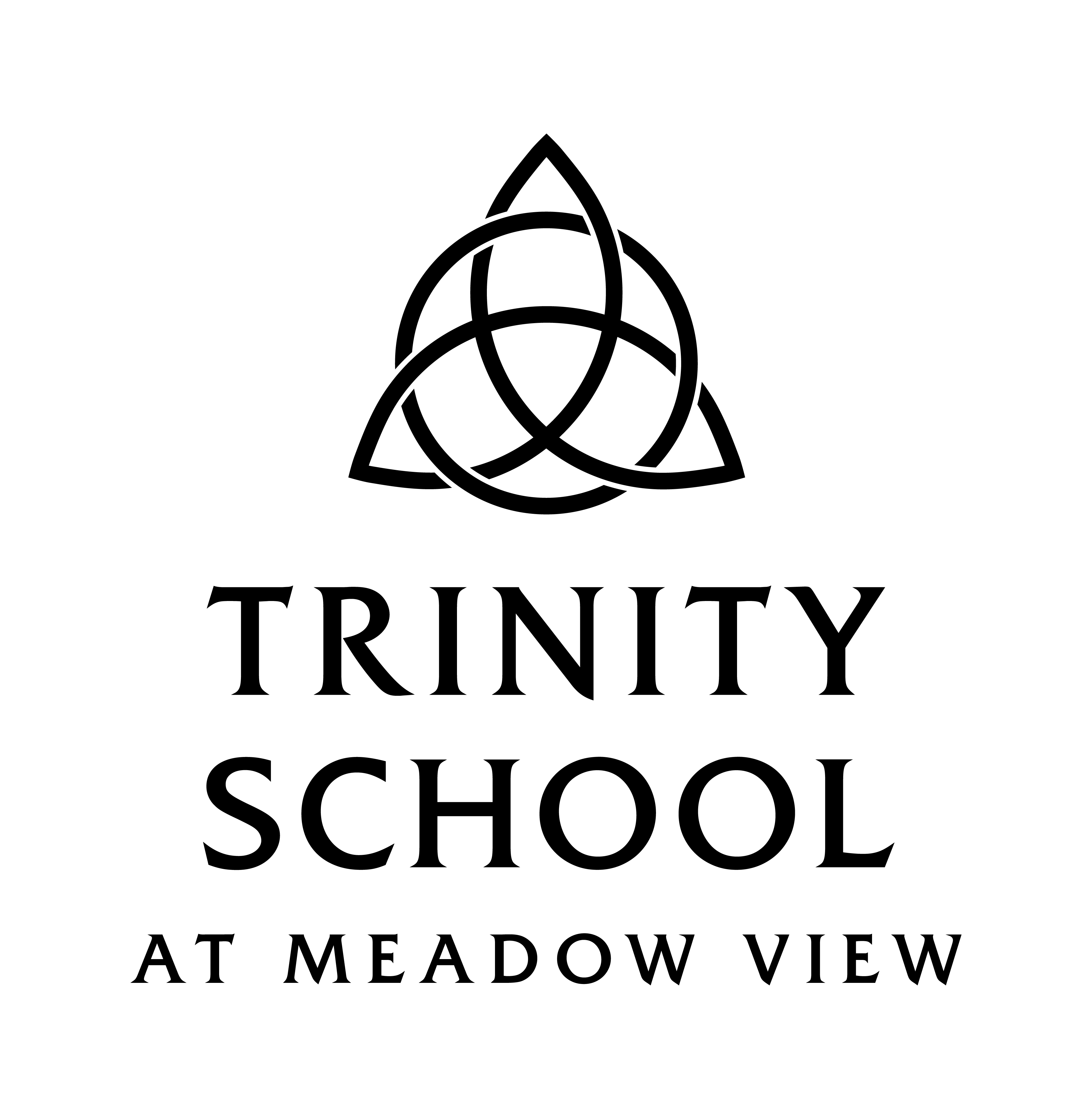

Trinity School at Meadow View was a private, Blue Ribbon Award-winning Christian school in Falls Church, Virginia. It was founded in 1998 by the People of Praise and provides classical Christian education to students in grades 7–12. It developed a strong educational presence in Northern Virginia and attracted international students. It was accredited by the Virginia Association of Independent Schools (VAIS).

The Meadow View campus had two sister schools, Greenlawn (South Bend, Indiana) and River Ridge (Eagan, Minnesota). The schools are independent, and are owned and operated by Trinity Schools, Inc. Timothy Maloney was the Head of School at Meadow View.

== Classes ==
Students at Trinity School at Meadow View took a variety of classes including a 6-year writing course and a 4-year Latin course. The curriculum focused on primary source material and small class sizes with dedicated, personal instruction from highly educated teachers. Students who completed the full six-year program also graduated with four years of music, art and theater.

== Athletics ==
In 2008, the Men's Varsity Lacrosse team won the VISAA Division II State Championship. In 2023 the Men's Varsity Soccer team reached the VISAA Division III State Championship before losing 2–1 to Veritas School in double overtime.
