= James Litton =

American musician (1934–2022)

James Litton (December 31, 1934 – November 1, 2022) was an American musician, who directed the American Boychoir from 1985 to 2001, and is widely recognized as one of the leading choral conductors of his day.

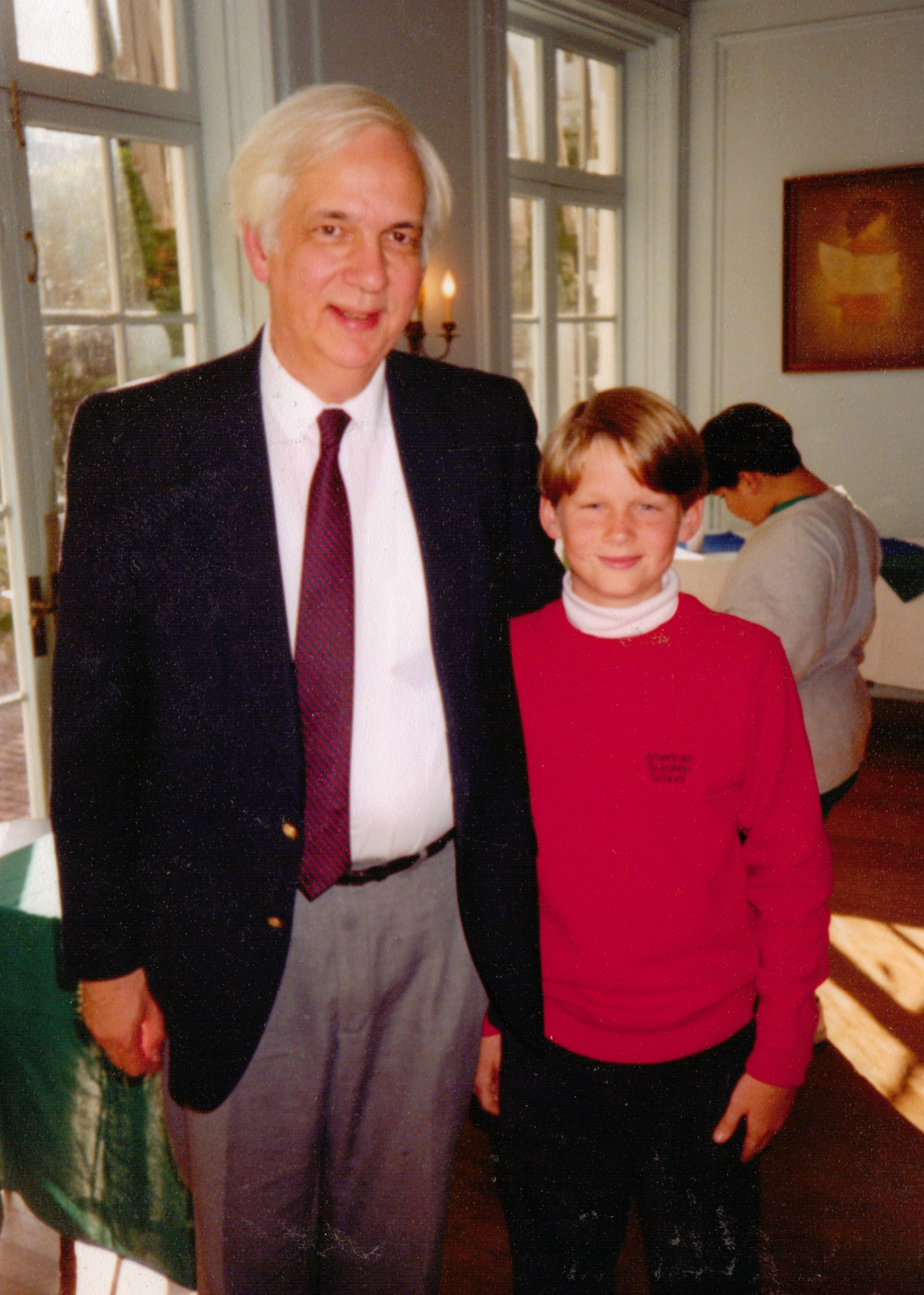
Dr James Litton and American Boychoir chorister Todd Smith (both native West Virginians)

== Overview ==
Litton conducted choral and orchestral works on five continents, and regularly led workshops and seminars in the United States and abroad, including appearances with the Berkshire Choral Festival, at the Tanglewood Music Festival, and at music festivals in Canada, Guatemala, Denmark, Germany, Latvia, France, Poland, the Czech Republic, South Korea, Taiwan, Japan and South Africa.

Litton was the founder of a number of choral ensembles, including community choruses, college, church and school choirs in West Virginia, Connecticut, Indiana, New York, and New Jersey. He has conducted choral groups, chamber music ensembles, and orchestras in more than 40 recordings, including many American Boychoir CDs on such labels as Angel Records, Philips Records, Sony Music Entertainment Inc., Virgin Records, Bertelsmann Music Group, Linn Records, and Music Masters. His most recent recordings include “Sing in Exultation,” a CD of music for the Advent and Christmas seasons with the Choirs of Washington National Cathedral, and “Sound from Heaven” with soprano Anna Maria Friman and the Girl Choristers of the cathedral. An avid writer for professional journals, with more than fifty articles to his credit, Dr Litton had also edited several books and collections of liturgical music.

== Early career ==
Prior to his recent appointments, and his tenure at the American Boychoir School, Dr. Litton was organist and director of music at St. Bartholomew's Episcopal Church, New York, for 13 years, and for an additional five years was the artistic consultant for the church. Earlier, he was assistant professor of organ and head of the church music department at Westminster Choir College of Rider University, and later, the C.F. Seabrook Director of Music at Princeton Theological Seminary. He had also served as visiting lecturer at Virginia Theological Seminary and at Sewanee: The University of the South. He has been a member and vice chairman of the Episcopal Church’s Standing Commission on Church Music, and participated in the preparation and publication of the Episcopal Hymnal 1982. Also, he was the editor of the Plainsong Psalter for the Episcopal Church. As a church musician, James Litton has had earlier appointments in Charleston, West Virginia, his native city; in Plainfield, New Jersey; in Southport, Connecticut; at the Episcopal Cathedral in Indianapolis, Indiana, and at Trinity Church in Princeton, New Jersey. He has played organ concerts throughout the United States and Canada, and during concert tours in Europe, South Africa, and Asia.

== American Boychoir ==
Litton was the director of the American Boychoir for sixteen years. He conducted the choir in more than 2,000 concerts in 48 of the American states, and in 12 other nations. He also conducted the choir in more than 30 professional recordings and in television special programs and commercial sound tracks. During his tenure at the American Boychoir School, he prepared the choir for recordings and for performances of major works with many of the world’s outstanding orchestras. The choir has also appeared in many music festivals in America and abroad.

In addition, he prepared the choir for more than 100 performances, broadcasts, and recordings with major orchestras. These included, among others, the New York Philharmonic, the Boston Symphony Orchestra, the Boston Pops Orchestra, the Philadelphia Orchestra, the National Symphony, the San Francisco Symphony, the Chicago Symphony Orchestra, the Vienna Philharmonic, the Berlin Philharmonic and the Israel Philharmonic Orchestra, in concerts which were under the direction of the world’s greatest conductors. In addition, he conducted concerts by the American Boychoir in America’s major concert halls, including Carnegie Hall, Lincoln Center for the Performing Arts, the John F. Kennedy Center for the Performing Arts, Symphony Hall, Boston, and the Dorothy Chandler Pavilion in Los Angeles. He also conducted the American Boychoir in soundtracks for award winning television commercials, movies, and television shows.

In February 2000, James Litton was installed as the first Litton-Lodal Music Director of the American Boychoir School. The Litton-Lodal music directorship was endowed by a gift from Jan and Elizabeth Lodal in honor of the career of James Litton. Mr. and Mrs. Lodal are long-time trustees of the American Boychoir School and parents of Eric Lodal, a 1990 graduate of the school. In making their gift, the Lodals said they wanted to guarantee for the future, the artistry and excellence which Dr. Litton has brought to the American Boychoir – “a gift he has given not just to those of us associated with the school, but to the entire world.” The Board of Trustees of the American Boychoir School has named James Litton as Music Director Emeritus of the American Boychoir.

== Retirement ==
Immediately after retirement from the American Boychoir, Dr. Litton served a two-year tenure as choirmaster of the Washington National Cathedral. At the cathedral, he conducted the Cathedral Choirs of Men and Girls, and Men and Boys in daily rehearsals and Evensongs, as well as in the weekend services of Holy Eucharist and Evensong. In addition, under his direction, the cathedral choirs sang for the ordination of the Bishop of Washington, in concerts, recordings, television, and public radio broadcasts, and during a prayer breakfast at the White House in the presence of the president and first lady. The Cathedral Choir of Men and Girls also sang under his direction for the National Convention of the American Guild of Organists in Philadelphia.

In the summer of 2002, he was the conductor of the AmericaFest honor choir and lecturer at the Sixth World Symposium on Choral Music in Minneapolis. He also served as visiting professor, college cantor and conductor of the St. Olaf Cantorei at St. Olaf College in Northfield, Minnesota, and was adjunct associate professor at Westminster Choir College of Rider University in Princeton, New Jersey. At Westminster, he conducted the Sophomore Schola and taught graduate and undergraduate courses in the sacred music department.

In 2004, Litton conducted the honor choir of boys and young men at the American Choral Directors Association Convention in Nashville, TN. As Music Director Emeritus of the American Boychoir, Litton continued to work on special projects for them. During the winter of 2004-05, two additional CDs with the American Boychoir were released – “Messe Basse,” a collection of 19th and 20th century French choral music, and a Christmas compilation, “Voices of Angels.”

During the 2005-06 season he served as the interim music director and conductor of the Adult Choir at the Nassau Presbyterian Church in Princeton, New Jersey. Most recently Litton was an international conductor at the 2nd International Boys and Men’s Choral Festival in Hradec Králové & Prague, Czech Republic from June 30 – July 7, 2008.

Litton acted as the choral director for the American Boychoir Alumni Chorus and then later retired at the end of the 2013-2014 season.

Litton died in Florham Park, New Jersey on November 1, 2022, at the age of 87. His funeral was held on November 12, 2022, at Trinity Church, Princeton. He was predeceased by his wife, Lou Ann, and was survived by his 4 children, several grandchildren and his sister.

== Education ==
James Litton had bachelor and master degrees from Westminster Choir College and was a Fellow of the Royal School of Church Music, one of seven Americans to receive this honor. Dr. Litton has been awarded Honorary Doctor of Music degrees from the University of Charleston, and from Westminster Choir College of Rider University.
