= Kevin Ranaghan =

American Catholic deacon and founder of the People of Praise

- Born: 1940 (age 85–86); New York City, New York, U.S.
- Education: University of Notre Dame (PhD)
- Spouse: Dorothy Ranaghan (m. 1966)
- Children: 6

Kevin Ranaghan (born 1940) is an American religious scholar, Catholic deacon, and a cofounder of the People of Praise

== Biography ==
=== Early life ===
Kevin Ranaghan was born in New York City in 1940 to parents of Irish Catholic descent.

While completing his doctoral degree in liturgical studies in the theology department at the University of Notre Dame, Kevin met his future wife, Dorothy. They were married in 1966.

=== Religious conversion ===
Ranaghan heard about a new work of the Holy Spirit in the lives of some friends at Duquesne University. After an initial period of skepticism, their prayer and study led him and his new wife to be baptized in the Holy Spirit on March 5, 1967.

=== Catholic Charismatic Renewal ===
In 1969, the Ranaghans published Catholic Pentecostals, the first book detailing the history of the Catholic Charismatic Renewal and articulating its theological implications. They linked baptism in the Spirit to a renewal of the sacraments of initiation. The book was translated into several languages, and Kevin Ranaghan traveled extensively, both in and out of the United States, to spread the news about this Pentecostal outpouring in the church.

His travels brought him into contact not only with Catholic groups throughout the world, but also with groups of Protestants from Pentecostal, mainline, and evangelical streams of Christianity. Ranaghan served as a bridge between Catholics and those from other denominations who, for the first time in history, were experiencing a simultaneous and similar renewal in the Spirit.

=== Committees and conferences ===
Ranaghan was ordained a permanent Catholic deacon in 1973. He joined United States National Service Committee for the Catholic Charismatic Renewal for 15 years, and for 11 years was its executive director.

He has been a principal organizer of national and international conferences, especially the 1975 Catholic Leaders Conference in Rome, and the 1977 Ecumenical Conference in Kansas City. Currently serving as an ICCRS Council member representing community expression of the renewal, Kevin also serves as council vice-president. He was a member of the council from the time of its establishment in the late 1970s until 1984. In 1990, he returned to the Council in his present role.

=== People of Praise ===
Ranaghan was a founding member of the People of Praise, an ecumenical Christian covenant community.

== Personal life ==
Ranaghan is married to Dorothy Ranaghan, and has six children and twelve grandchildren.

== See also ==
- Catholic Charismatic Renewal
- The People of Praise
