= People of Praise =

U.S. Christian intentional community

- Abbreviation: POP
- Formation: 1971
- Type: Network of ecumenical Christian intentional communities
- Headquarters: South Bend, Indiana, US
- Members: About 1,700
- Website: peopleofpraise.org

People of Praise is a network of lay Christian intentional communities. As a parachurch apostolate, membership is open to any baptized Christian who affirms the Nicene Creed and agrees to the community's covenant. The majority of its members are Catholics, but Protestants can also join, reflecting the ecumenical nature of People of Praise. It has 22 branches in the United States, Canada, and the Caribbean, with approximately 1,700 members. It founded Trinity Schools, which are aligned with the philosophy of classical Christian education.

People of Praise was formed in 1971 by Kevin Ranaghan and Paul DeCelles. Both men were involved in the Catholic Charismatic Renewal, in which Pentecostal religious experiences such as baptism in the Holy Spirit, speaking in tongues and prophecy are practiced by Catholics. In its early history, it influenced the institutional development of the Catholic Charismatic movement in the United States and played important roles in national charismatic conferences.

People of Praise practices a form of spiritual direction that involves the supervision of a member by a more "spiritually mature" person called a "head". People of Praise maintains that members retain their freedom of conscience under such direction. The community, like the Catholic Church, has few women in leadership positions. It nevertheless encourages women to pursue higher education and employment.

== History ==
The founding of People of Praise by Kevin Ranaghan and Paul DeCelles in 1971 in South Bend, Indiana, while the two were graduate students, was an early and important event within the history of the overall covenant community movement. Various individuals who participated in its founding had attended Cursillo movement retreats, including another graduate student, Stephen B. Clark (who came to author Building Christian Communities in 1972). In 1963, after having attended the Archdiocesan Cursillo Center in Chicago, Clark organized a Cursillo retreat in South Bend. Influenced both by Cursillo, local prayer meetings were formed. After Bill Storey visited from Duquesne University in 1967, elements from out of as well the burgeoning Catholic charismatic renewal of the times, were incorporated into these meetings.

Eventually several Catholic covenant communities were formed. After Word of God community formed in Ann Arbor, Michigan, in 1967, and the True House (1971–1974) and People of Praise communities (1971–present) were formed in South Bend. (Others formed since then include Sword of the Spirit, the Mother of God Community as well as constituent members of the North American Network of Charismatic Covenant Communities.) Such communities were influenced by the 1960s Jesus movement, the Shepherding movement, as well as perhaps some of the communitarianism of that era's counterculture.

Historical theologian Paul Thigpen writes that in general these communities "typically involved a commitment to at least some degree of sharing financial resources, regular participation in community gatherings, and submission to the direction of the group's designated authorities." Larger communities were often divided into "households", which did not always mean members were living in the same house. However, members of the same household needed to live close enough to each other to share meals, prayer times and other forms of fellowship. Most households were made up of one or two families, but others might be for single men or women.

People of Praise experienced early growth recruiting from major universities and was especially closely connected to the University of Notre Dame. The group helped develop important institutions for the larger Catholic Charismatic movement. Until 1990, the South Bend community was the headquarters for the National Service Committee (a coordinating body for the various Catholic charismatic groups). It was also the headquarters of the Charismatic Renewal Services (a national distribution center for religious books and tapes) and published a magazine called New Heaven, New Earth. It also played a major role in the renewal's annual national conferences. By 1987, People of Praise had around 3,000 members, including children. By the end of the 1980s, Catholics were 92 percent of the membership.

The overall Catholic charismatic renewal had begun in the United States in 1967 and saw Pentecostal religious experience and practices such as baptism in the Holy Spirit and speaking in tongues embraced by members of the Catholic Church. People of Praise became involved with the international body of the Renewal movement is the International Catholic Charismatic Renewal Services, located first in Brussels and later in Rome. They have also worked ecumenically through participation in the International Charismatic Consultation, the Charismatic Concerns Committee, the Charismatic Leaders Fellowship and, more recently, in the Rome-based Gathering in the Holy Spirit. Members also served with Cardinal Josef Suenens in drafting of Malines Documents I and II, and with Father Kilian McDonnell, in the writing of Fanning the Flame. These documents have contributed to the articulation and understanding of charismatic renewal and its place in the Catholic Church. They have also contributed to an understanding of how this movement can be understood by members of Protestant denominations of Christianity.

The group has drawn media interest due to Judge Amy Coney Barrett's association with the group. Numerous media outlets have reported that Barrett is a member. In the wake of heightened interest in the group and its members following her nomination, People of Praise removed some materials from its website: "Recent changes to our website were made in consultation with members and nonmembers from around the country who raised concerns about their and their families' privacy due to heightened media attention."

== Description ==
People of Praise defines itself as an ecumenical, charismatic covenant community "of families and single people who seek to participate in the mission of the church in our time and to live our lives communally". Members live in their own homes, and sometimes single people will live with an unrelated family. There are some households in which only single men or single women live together.

People of Praise is not a church. All members of the community simultaneously remain members of their local parishes. The majority of its members are Catholics, with Lutherans, Anglicans, Methodists, Pentecostals and nondenominational Christians also represented. The Spirit and Purpose of the People of Praise state that "we will live our lives together as fully as our churches permit, with the hope that we may soon attain a unity of faith in the fullness of Christ our Lord."

Members of the People of Praise engage in weekly meetings that include religious teaching, Scripture readings, witnessing, and prayer for those with needs. Local groups may also hold charismatic prayer meetings and meet for dinner, fellowship and praise and worship. Members also meet in small groups.

Anthropologist Thomas Csordas has written that People of Praise is theologically conservative with a hierarchical leadership structure, but it is also influenced by the communitarianism of the 1960s counterculture.

=== Covenant ===
The People of Praise considers itself to be a "covenant community." The community considers the covenant, when entered into among members, to be one of mutual care and service in spiritual, material, and financial matters. The covenant is not an oath or vow; a member is released from it if they believe God is calling them to another way of life. The covenant states:

Therefore, we covenant ourselves to live our lives together in Christ, our Lord, by the power of his spirit. We agree to be a basic Christian community, to find within our fellowship the essential core of our life in the spirit, in worship and the sacraments, spiritual and moral guidance, service, and apostolic activity. We accept the order of this community, which the Lord is establishing with all the ministry gifts of the Holy Spirit, especially with the foundational ministry gifts of apostles, pastors, prophets, teachers, and evangelists. We agree to obey the direction of the Holy Spirit manifested in and through these ministries in full harmony with the Church. We recognize in the covenant a unique relationship one to another and between the individual and the community. We accept the responsibility for mutual care, concern, and ministry among ourselves. We will serve one another and the community as a whole in all needs: spiritual, material, financial. We agree that the weekly meeting of the community is primary among our commitments and that we will not be absent except for a serious reason.

Membership is open to all baptized Christians who believe in the Nicene Creed. There are two stages of membership in the community: underway and covenanted. People who are new to the community join as underway members. This stage of membership is meant as a time for people new to the community to freely explore (in consultation with the leadership) whether they belong in the community. Underway members participate in all aspects of community life. Full membership occurs when one makes a public commitment to the covenant. Members make this pledge freely after a formation and instruction period that normally lasts three to six years.

=== Organizational leadership ===
People of Praise is led by an eleven-member all-male board of governors, the chairman of which is the overall coordinator. The board's responsibilities include electing the overall coordinator, establishing new branches, determining official teachings, approving the budget, and approving appointments made by the overall coordinator. Board members serve for six-year terms and cannot serve more than two consecutive terms.

Each location of the community is called a branch. The larger branches are led by a group of branch coordinators. These branches are divided into areas, which are each led by an area coordinator. The principal branch coordinator serves as the main leader of the branch. Smaller or newer branches are led by a team of branch leaders. All these coordinators or branch leaders are selected from among the covenanted men in a branch. On matters of great importance, consultations involving all full or "covenanted" members of the community guide the direction of the community, including (within a branch) the selection of coordinators. Branch members nominate three people, and one is selected to be a coordinator by the overall coordinator.

=== Headships and laypastor–penitent relationships ===
Spiritual direction is an important part of People of Praise intentional community, which takes the form of headships or lay-pastoral counselling; according to anthropologist Thomas Csordas, "individual members are supervised in their daily lives by a person regarded as more 'spiritually mature.'" Pastoral care is considered an important service within the community; it is believed to foster relationships of love, service and charismatic ministry. Each member has someone called a "head", who acts as a personal adviser. Influenced by Ignatian spirituality (the Spiritual Exercises of Ignatius of Loyola), heads, in general, give encouragement, correction, and help in decision-making. Men have other men as their heads. Married women are headed by their husbands. Single women and widows usually have other women as their heads. Men and women with the appropriate skills are assigned as heads by the coordinators. People of Praise uses the Spiritual Exercises of Ignatius of Loyola as a basis for counsel and discernment.

According to Sean Connolly, communications director for People of Praise, functions of lay-pastoral counsellors and prayer meeting leaders within the community are not authoritarian in nature: "Freedom of conscience is a key to our diversity. People of Praise members are always free to follow their consciences, as formed by the light of reason, experience, and the teachings of their churches."

As a charismatic community, People of Praise recognizes prophecy as one of the spiritual gifts or charisms. Leaders of the community will consider the meaning of messages deemed prophetic when making decisions concerning group life, and sometimes will publish prophecy in community newsletters. There is no formal office of prophet, but the community does have a "word gifts" group made up of members that are considered to be gifted in prophecy on a regular basis.

=== Gender roles ===
The highest office a woman can hold in the community is "woman leader" (until 2017, "handmaid"). Women leaders "teach women on womanly affairs, give advice, help in troubled situations" and lead specialized women's activities. The term handmaid had been chosen in 1971 as a reference to Mary, the mother of Jesus, who, in most English translations of the Bible, described herself as "the handmaid of the Lord" or a woman who is close to God. The community teaches that husbands are the head of the household as well as the spiritual head of their wives. While it emphasizes traditional gender roles, the organization encourages women to pursue higher education and employment.

In much of community life, men and women work together without distinction. Both men and women prophesy and exhort at community meetings, teach together in the community sponsored schools, serve together as counselors at community camps, or as members or heads of music ministries, and evangelize together in inner cities. Still, there are some significant distinctions in the roles of men and women. As noted above, women are not able to be coordinators. The community, which refers to itself as a "family of families," sees this patriarchal tradition as following the biblical model of the family. Men and women meet separately each week in small groups called 'men's groups' or 'women's groups.' The purpose is to build deeper relationships as brothers and sisters in Christ by discussing their lives and other issues with the goal of gaining wisdom, deepening friendships, and encouraging one another to be faithful to God. Traditional roles are reinforced by encouraging men to do most of the heavier physical work involved when a family is moving to a new home or re-roofing a house, and when setting up for meetings and similar tasks. Women are encouraged to provide food and childcare and run an effective household. However, these distinctions are not absolute. For example, women have also labored side by side with men in the construction work involved in the community's Allendale outreach.

=== LGBTQ+ people ===
The organization holds that homosexual activity is a sin and opposes gay marriage. Members who disclose such activity are expelled from the organization, and children of same-gender parents are not allowed into the group's schools.

== Divisions and affiliated organizations ==
=== Campus Division ===
The Campus Division of the People of Praise is made up of mostly college students. Members live together in student households. Most households hold regular prayer together and often eat together. While some are not in school, most members of the Campus Division attend a variety of colleges and universities, including the University of Minnesota, IUPUI, Saint Mary's College, Holy Cross College and the University of Notre Dame. Members of the Campus Division consider their common life together to be part of what the People of Praise has labeled as to its city-building work.

=== Action Division ===
According to the organisation's website, the Action Division consists of high school students and adults working together "to bring Christ's love to impoverished communities in real and tangible ways." At this point, their work primarily involves outreach in a poor neighborhood called Allendale in the city of Shreveport, Louisiana. A second location has begun in inner-city Indianapolis, Indiana. However, members say that they could work in other areas in the future. The Action Division aims to "provide those in need with an experience of God's love for them." This consists of providing jobs, affordable housing, strong families, and prayer for physical healing. Action Division members work together to "share all aspects of life" with those who are in need; these needs may be material, financial, spiritual, intellectual or social.

=== WorkLight ===
WorkLight (Formerly known as Christians in Commerce International) is a movement of business and professional men and women that is dedicated to helping members grow in the Christian life and to influence the world of commerce with the gospel. Although WorkLight operates independently from the People of Praise, the People of Praise movement helped form WorkLight in its initial stages and is actively engaged in its work. WorkLight is organized into 30 local Men's Chapters, Women's Chapters. These chapters have held retreats (Challenge Weekends) that have been attended by over 14,000 men and women.

=== Trinity Schools ===
Trinity Schools is a group of schools founded by People of Praise which teaches middle school and high school age children. While the schools operate as an independent nonprofit 501(c)(3) organization, the goals and procedures are influenced by the approach of the People of Praise. Trinity Schools provide a Classical Christian education heavily influenced by elements of Christian humanism for grades six through twelve. The schools follow an academic core curriculum which includes six years of mathematics, five years of science, 11 semesters of writing, six years of literature, around eight semesters of an ancient language such as Latin, and two semesters of a foreign language. Students also take one full year and two years of partial courses in music, drawing, and painting and two semesters of drama. The schools are ecumenical Christian. On its website Trinity School (in each of its three instances) is self-described as "an ecumenical Christian school witnessing to the fundamental unity of all who are baptized into Christ." Students take 5 semesters of scriptural studies (through an ecumenical Christian approach) and either a Catholic or Protestant doctrine course. Trinity Schools maintain small classes with single-sex instruction except in a few key courses such as drama, art, and foreign languages. The schools teach the theory of evolution, that marriage is only between opposite sexes, and to observe chastity until and throughout marriage.

There are three locations:

- Greenlawn, in South Bend, Indiana
- Meadow View, in Falls Church, Virginia
- River Ridge, in Eagan, Minnesota

=== Brotherhood of the People of Praise ===
The Brotherhood of the People of Praise is a private association of the Christian faithful with official status in the Catholic Church.

While the People of Praise religious community has no official ties with any Christian church or denomination, a number of Catholic men who are members of this community have sought to regularize their status with the Catholic Church in order to be ordained Catholic priests. This group of men now has official status in the Catholic Church as a private association of the Christian faithful. "It has a membership of about 12 men, four of them now priests." Peter Leslie Smith, a member of the group, was named an auxiliary bishop for the Archdiocese of Portland in Oregon by Pope Francis and was ordained a bishop on April 29, 2014.

== Reception ==
Ralph C. Martin, the president of Renewal Ministries, who previously managed the 'association of covenant communities' alongside People of Praise leadership, stated in the National Catholic Register that People of Praise is "part of the papally-approved mainstream of the Catholic Charismatic Renewal, which has been encouraged by every pope since Vatican II, none more strongly than Pope Francis."

Adrian Reimers, a Catholic theological critic and pioneering member of People of Praise from 1971 until his dismissal from the group in 1985, has criticized teachings of People of Praise that he views as authoritarian and male-gender centric and criticized its overall ecclesiastic structure, regretting its sense of primacy vis-à-vis the Church owing to the group's ecumenical nature and in turn its lack of direct oversight by professional Catholic clergy.

Dr Reimers founded the organisation Free Again in Christ to help people leave the People of Praise and similar covenant community groups which Dr Reimers characterises as "particularly powerful means of psychological and social control".

Some former members of People of Praise have described the group's culture as insular to the point that it felt intrusive and controlling, claims that the group's current members dispute.

After the nomination of Amy Coney Barrett to the Supreme Court, many articles from mainstream press referred to the People of Praise as a cult.

== Allegations of child abuse and cover-up ==
=== 1970s–80s ===
In October 2020, former member of the community, Sarah Kuehl, said she and others had been sexually abused when children during the 1970s by a community member who lived in her household. (Kuehl's family at the time belonged to Servants of the Lord, a covenant community that later merged with People of Praise.) Kuehl alleged that leaders in the People of Praise later attempted to "hide and cover up" what they knew about the abuse, as they kept her abuser in the People of Praise community.

=== 2000s ===
In June 2021, the Washington Post interviewed nine members of a Facebook group who claimed to have been sexually abused at People of Praise community, and one person who claimed physical abuse.

=== Internal investigation ===
In 2020, the coordinator of People of Praise, Craig Lent, said in an e-mail that an expert investigation was being conducted into the allegations. Lent said, "We consider allegations of sexual misconduct very seriously and invite anyone with information about any acts of child sexual abuse to act consistent with our policies, which include immediately reporting to the appropriate authorities."

== Notable members ==
- Amy Coney Barrett, associate justice of the United States Supreme Court.
- Peter Leslie Smith, a Roman Catholic auxiliary bishop of the Archdiocese of Portland in Oregon, has been a member since 1983.
- Christopher Dietzen, a former associate justice of the Minnesota Supreme Court.
- Joe Zakas, a former Indiana state legislator.

== See also ==
- Complementarianism
- Shepherding movement

== Sources ==
- Agnew, Mary Barbara (1997). "Charismatic Renewal". In Glazier, Michael; Shelly, Thomas J. (eds.). The Encyclopedia of American Catholic History. Liturgical Press. ISBN 978-0814659199.
- Csordas, Thomas J. (1997). Language, Charisma, and Creativity: The Ritual Life of a Religious Movement. Berkeley, California: University of California Press. ISBN 978-0520204690.
- LaVergne, Colin (2008). "Can A People of Praise Member Be Fully Catholic?" (Audio CD). Resurrection Communications.
- Ranaghan, Kevin; Dorothy Ranaghan (July–August 2003). "New Move of the Holy Spirit". Goodnews. National Service Committees for the Catholic Charismatic Renewal in England and Ireland. Archived from the original on February 6, 2007.
- Rath, Ralph (1994). Christian Community: A Reporter's Inside Look. South Bend, Indiana: Peter Publications. ISBN 0-9640167-6-1. Archived from the original on July 18, 2006.
- Thigpen, T. Paul (2002). "Catholic Charismatic Renewal". In Burgess, Stanley M.; Van der Maas, Eduard M. (eds.). The New International Dictionary of Pentecostal and Charismatic Movements (revised and expanded ed.). Zondervan. ISBN 978-0-310-22481-5.
