= American Boychoir School =

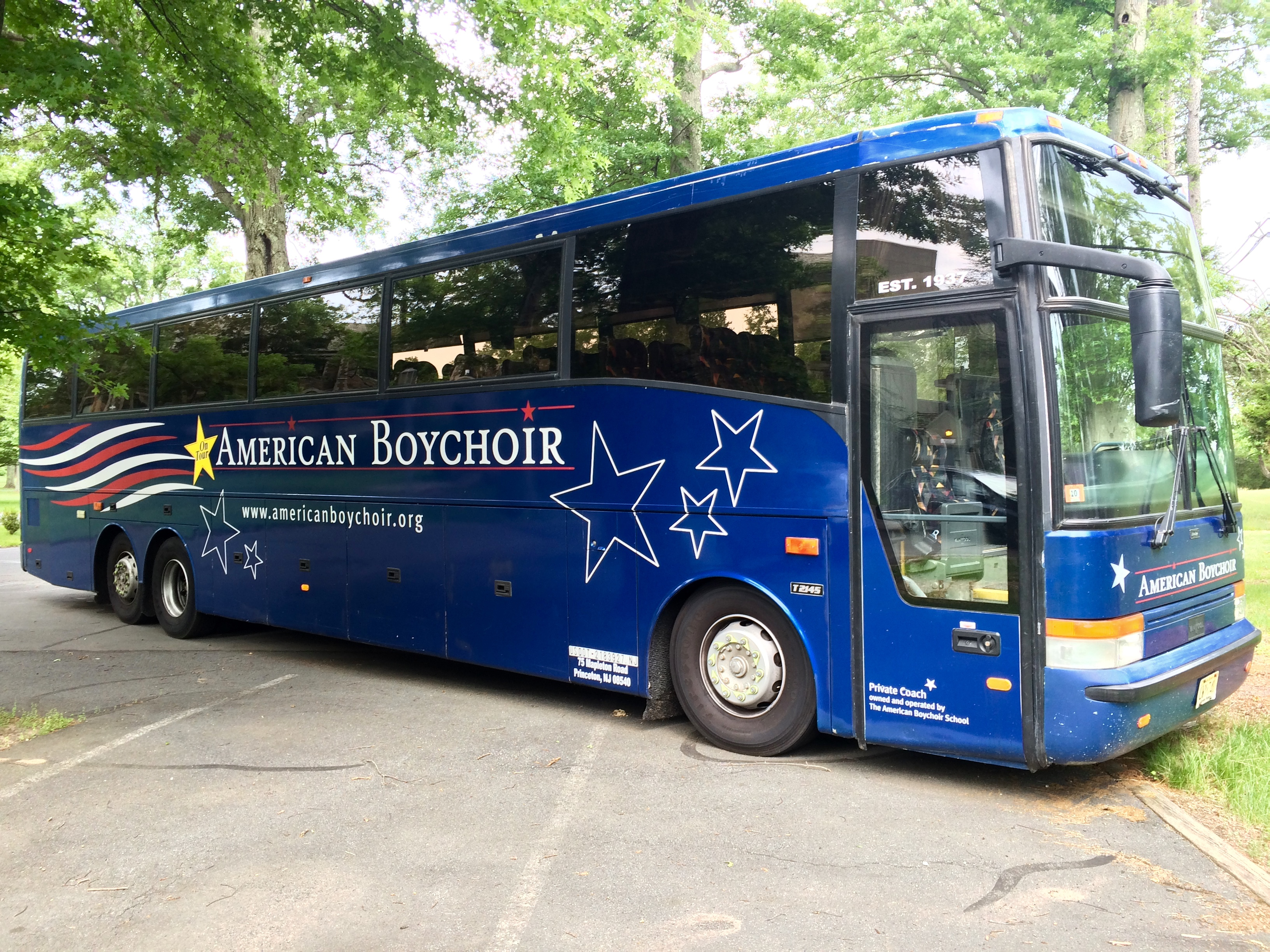
- The bus of the American Boychoir School at Saint Joseph's Seminary
- Princeton, New Jersey; United States

Information
- Type: Private, non-sectarian boarding school
- Motto: Brothers, Sing On!
- Established: 1937
- Closed: August 15, 2017

The American Boychoir School was a boarding/day middle school located in Princeton, New Jersey, and the home of the American Boychoir. The school originated as the Columbus Boychoir in Columbus, Ohio. In 1950, the school relocated after receiving property in Princeton, New Jersey from the Lambert estate. In 1980, the school was renamed the American Boychoir School. It remained in this location until the sale of Albemarle in 2012. The school served boys in grades 4–8 (and through grade 9 in the 1960s), many of whom came from across the United States and from many countries. It was one of only two boychoir boarding schools in the United States, the other being Saint Thomas Choir School in New York City. The school provided opportunity to boys from across the world to experience the rich world of music. The Boychoir toured across the contiguous United States, through Canada, as well as internationally, allowing students to gain diverse cultural perspective while performing at the professional level. The American Boychoir performed with numerous orchestras, frequently including the New York Philharmonic as well as the Philadelphia Symphony Orchestra.

In 2002, the school was embroiled in a scandal due to allegations of sexual abuse of students by faculty and other students. The school served as the basis for a fictionalized choir in the 2014 film Boychoir.

From 2012 to 2015, the school's location changed multiple times due to declining admissions and limited funding options. In 2015, the school filed for Chapter 11 bankruptcy and ultimately closed on August 15, 2017.

== Choir ==
The American Boychoir performed in concerts across the United States and at international venues. On average, the choir made over 200 appearances in four to five major tours annually. The choir performed with the New York Philharmonic, the Berlin Philharmonic, the Boston Symphony Orchestra, The St. Olaf Choir, cellist Yo-Yo Ma, trumpeter Wynton Marsalis, and several opera singers including Jessye Norman, Frederica von Stade and Kathleen Battle. The choir had television appearances on NBC's Today show , the Bell Telephone Hour annual, live Christmas Eve show, and was featured on sixteen recordings.

In the 2004–2005 season, the Boychoir performed at the 77th annual Academy Awards with pop singer Beyoncé Knowles and with Jessye Norman before the United States Open (tennis) women's singles final. The choir also had tours across the United States and Canada, an appearance in Boston and at Carnegie Hall in celebration of James Levine’s inaugural season as music director of the Boston Symphony Orchestra, and six performances with the Philadelphia Orchestra.

From 2013 to 2016, the Concert Choir completed several national tours (several to the Midwest and Southern states, California and the Northwest, Texas and the Southwest), and sang at festivals in South Korea and France. The combined Training and Concert Choirs contributed to Tim Janis' The American Christmas Carol at Carnegie Hall in December, 2015. The Boychoir was featured often by the Philadelphia Orchestra; highlights included Carmina Burana in October 2013, Bach's St. Matthew Passion in April 2015, and, most recently Mahler's Symphony 8 in March, 2016.

The American Boychoir was subdivided into two choirs: the Concert Choir and the Training Choir. The Concert Choir, last conducted by Fernando Malvar-Ruiz, performed and toured regularly while the Training Choir, last conducted by Fred Meads, was made up of first-year students who receive training in order to move up to the Concert Choir when they were ready. Boys joined the choir by auditioning while visiting the school, or auditioning after Boychoir performances at concert sites or after school programs. An alumnus could join the Alumni Chorus, conducted by music director emeritus, James Litton. Auditions were required for enrollment into The American Boychoir School.

== School ==
The American Boychoir School was a non-profit, non-sectarian organization. The school did not discriminate in its admissions, scholarship programs or activities on the basis of race, color, national or ethnic origin, gender or religion, and was an accredited member of Middle States Association. Admissions were rolling and boys often joined the student body after the school year had begun.

The school's educational program was designed to be largely interdisciplinary, with project based learning (PBL) its primary focus. Classes were small (maximum of 12 students) and boys studied in self-contained classrooms with a grade-level teacher who delivered the Language Arts, Social Studies, and Science curricula in interdisciplinary "modules." 4th and 5th grade boys studied together in a class labeled the "Lower School." The goal of all student work was authentic, summative assessment of individual and group achievement, and boys regularly reported on their learning to audiences of their peers, as well as experts in specific fields outside the school.

Mathematics instruction at the school was entirely differentiated by student and delivered with mixed methodology which included direct and dedicated Mathematics teacher instruction, textbook interaction, and a web-based Mathematics curriculum (TenMarks) that was supported by a 1:1 iPad program. Each student studied Mathematics independently (with small group instruction when warranted and appropriate) and proceeded according to his own abilities and interests; as a result, within each grade level, boys may have been working below, at, or above—sometimes far above—grade level.

All boys received Latin instruction. The Latin curriculum emphasized grammar and vocabulary that supported parallel Language Arts development, and simple story translation.

All boys also received Music Theory instruction at one of four levels and all new boys received keyboard training for their first year at the school.

Physical education classes were held four days per week. All boys participated.

Many graduates of the school went on to the most competitive independent high schools around the country, including Interlochen Arts Academy, Phillips Exeter Academy, Phillips Academy, Lawrenceville School, Peddie School, St. Andrew's School, and Avon Old Farms. About 20-30% of ABS graduates went on to their home public high schools.

=== Academics on tour ===
The educational program was integrated with the Boychoir's touring responsibilities throughout the school year. Modules at each grade level were developed to take advantage of the routes the boys followed when they toured. Much effort was made to match the curricula with enrichment activities while on tour, such as visits to museums, historical sites, and environmental areas that illustrated and enhanced what the boys were learning. One teacher traveled with every tour.

=== Summer music programs ===
The American Boychoir had two distinct summer music programs: Camp Albemarle and The American Boychoir Experience.

Camp Albemarle provided choruses, a musicianship training program and a small group vocal instruction training program.

The American Boychoir Experience was for boys ages 9–12 only, and provided the experience of one week in the life of an American Boychoir School student without the academic classes. The week included choral training, music theory, in addition to traditional summer camp activities. This professional experience in choral training culminated in a formal concert. An audition was necessary to participate in The American Boychoir Experience.

== History ==
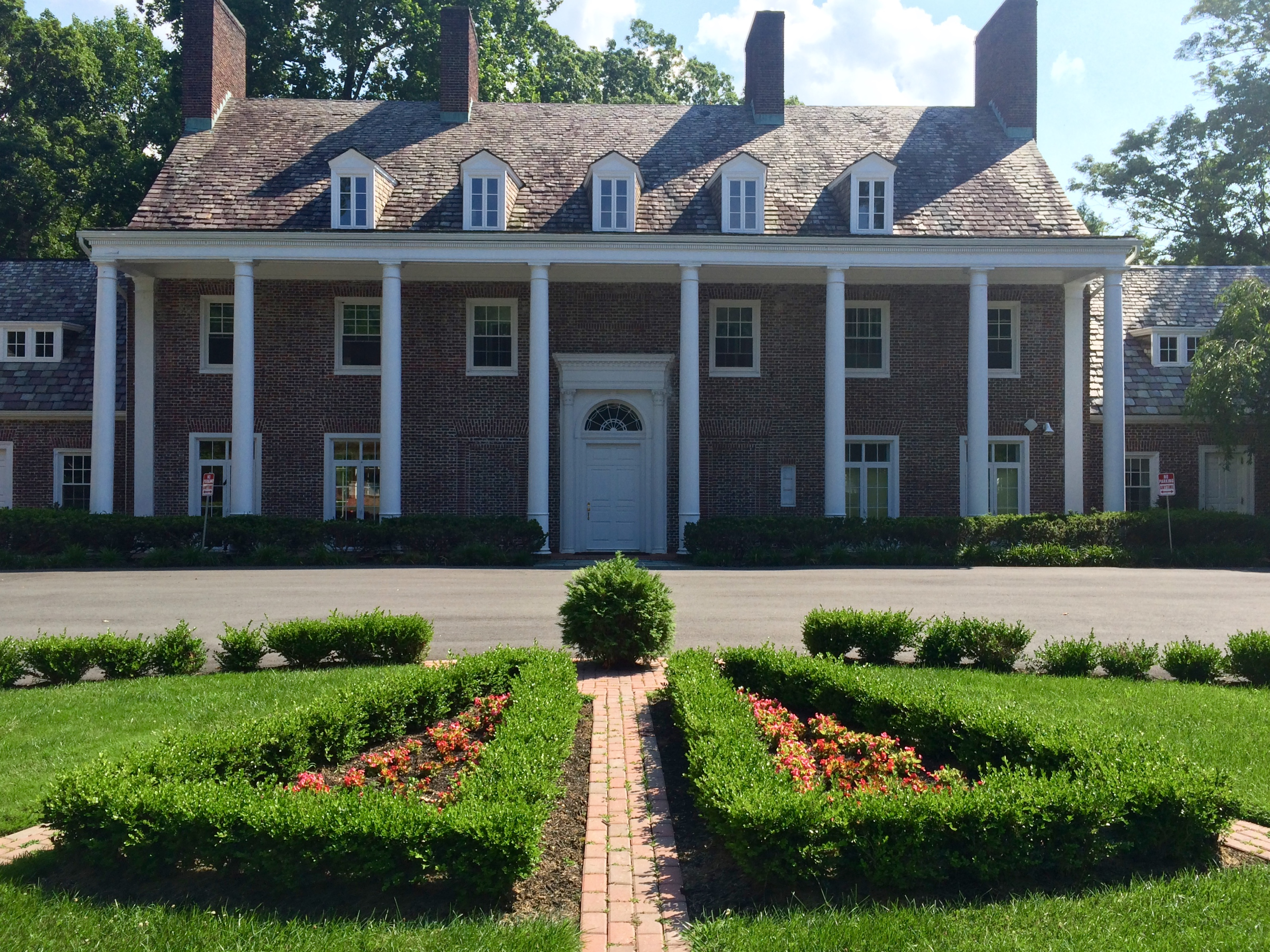
Albemarle, the 1917 estate of pharmaceutical magnate Gerard Lambert, home to the school from 1952 to 2012

The choir and school were founded in Columbus, Ohio, in 1937, by Herbert Huffman who believed that "the experience of performing the great choral literature – and performing it at the highest professional levels – could have a profound effect on the academic, social and moral development of boys". Founded as the Columbus Boychoir, the group moved to Princeton in 1950. It changed its name to the American Boychoir in 1980.

Former choir directors at the choir school include Herbert Huffman (founder), Donald Bryant, Robert W. Haley, Howard Jewell, Donald G. Hanson, John Kuzma, Jim Litton, Craig Denison, Wallace Hornady and Nathan Wadley. The choir recorded for RCA Victor during Herbert Huffman's tenure before moving to the Decca Label during the Donald Bryant years, where the choir released multiple LP's including one with Bing Crosby. Later, the boychoir would release CDs on its own Albemarle Records label. (see complete Discography below).

From 1985 to 2001, the boychoir was conducted by James Litton, an expert on children's choral techniques and vocal production. Regarded as one of America's prominent choral conductors, Litton led the boychoir in more than 2,000 concerts in 49 states and 12 nations. Litton also introduced the changing voice and established SATB sections in the choir. He helped recognize that all boys should continue singing regardless of their voice change.

In 2012, the choir's longtime home, Albemarle in Princeton, was sold under the presidency of Robert Rund and the choir moved to the Princeton Center for the Arts & Education (formerly St. Joseph's Seminary) for the 2013 and 2014 school years.

On April 10, 2015, the school filed for Chapter 11 bankruptcy stating it needed $350,000 to finish the school year and $3 million to come out of bankruptcy and open for the next academic year. On April 14, 2015, the school announced it would end the school year early, on May 17, instead of reaching the normal time for graduation, the second week of June.

The school reopened on September 1, 2015, and operated during the 2015–16 school year while working to satisfy its financial obligations and emerge from the Chapter 11 bankruptcy stable and able to move forward successfully. School operations were moved to the campus of Rambling Pines Summer Camp, site of the former Princeton Latin Academy. Rambling Pines provided classroom and office space, gymnasium space, and almost 200 acres of playing fields.

The American Boychoir School closed on August 15, 2017. [1]

=== 2002 lawsuit and sexual abuse allegations ===
In April 2002, The New York Times reported sexual abuse which had taken place at the Boychoir School several decades earlier by Choir Director Donald G. Hanson and other staff. In court documents, the American Boychoir claimed that it had no duty to protect children in their care from sexual abuse and that children who were abused were themselves negligent for not bringing the abuse to light. One of the students who had claimed that he was victimized was constitutional scholar Lawrence Lessig, who has represented another student, John Hardwicke, in his lawsuit against the school. In its court filings, the school claimed that Hardwicke, then 12, had consented to sex and said that he was negligent in not reporting the incident at the time. Many other boys have now come forward and said they were sexually abused, either by staff members or other older students enrolled at the school. This alleged abuse occurred in the 1970s, 1980s, and into the late 1990s. The school adopted new policies to protect the boys from further sexual abuse, but paid over $850,000 in settlement money to one victim to avoid further lawsuits.

On August 8, 2006, the New Jersey Supreme Court ruled against the school's appeal of a lower court decision. The school had contended that the state's charitable immunity act protected it from liability in sexual abuse lawsuits brought by former students. The court found that the Charitable Immunity Act immunizes charities for negligence only; it does not bar statutory or common-law claims that are based on willful, wanton or grossly negligent conduct. The school's lawyers requested the New Jersey Supreme Court to reconsider the decision, claiming the ruling represented a major extension of vicarious liability. On January 5, 2006, then-Governor of New Jersey Richard Codey signed bill S540/A2512 into New Jersey law, ending the Boychoir's charitable immunity defense, and making New Jersey the 48th state to allow victims of childhood sex abuse to sue churches, schools and other non-profits for the actions of their staff.

== Discography ==
- I Hear America Singing (2013), Albemarle Records AR 1008, The American Boychoir, Fernando Malvar-Ruiz, Litton-Lodal Music Director
- Journey On...Passport to a World of Music (2010), Albemarle Records AR 1007, The American Boychoir, Fernando Malvar-Ruiz, Litton-Lodal Music Director
- ACDA concert, Oklahoma City, Oklahoma, with other choirs (2009)
- St. Matthew Passion (2008), Kurt Masur, The American Boychoir, Westminster Choir College and the New York Philharmonic
- Harmony: American Songs of Faith (2007), Albemarle Records AR 1006. The American Boychoir, St. Olaf Choir, and Alumni Chorus of the American Boychoir School. Fernando Malvar-Ruiz, Litton-Lodal Music Director; Anton Armstrong, Conductor; James Litton, Music Director Emeritus
- Columbus~American Boychoir (2007), 70th Anniversary Compilation
- A Princeton Christmas for the Children of Africa (2007), The American Boychoir, Princeton Day School Choir Madrigal Singers, The Princeton Girlchoir, The Princeton High School Choir, The Princeton University Chapel Choir, the Tartantones of Stuart Country Day School of the Sacred Heart, The Westminster Choir, and the Westminster Concert Bell Choir of Westminster Choir College, All proceeds benefit the UN World Food Program
- Messe Basse (2004), Albemarle Records AR1005, The American Boychoir, James Litton, Conductor; Scott Dettra, Organ
- Voices of Angels (2004) Albemarle Records, The American Boychoir, James Litton and Fernando Malvar-Ruiz, Conductors
- The Lost Christmas Eve (2004) Lava/Atlantic Records 93146-2 distributed by Atlantic Records, Trans-Siberian Orchestra (The American Boychoir is heard on Track 5, Remember), Gold sales of this album were certified by the Recording Industry Association of America in 2005
- Benjamin Britten: A Ceremony of Carols(2003), Albemarle Records 1003, The American Boychoir, Vincent Metallo, Conductor; John Charles Schuker, Organ; Barbara Ann Biggers, Harp
- Lullaby, Music for the Quiet Times (2002), Albemarle Records 1002, The American Boychoir, James Litton, Music Director
- American Songfest (2002), Albemarle Records 1001, The American Boychoir, Vincent Metallo, Music Director
- Kurt Masur at the New York Philharmonic (special edition) (2001), The American Boychoir with the New York Choral Artists, The Philharmonic-Symphony Society of New York, Inc.; Kurt Masur, Music Director
- Litton Live! – The Farewell Concert (2002) American Boychoir 103 The Concert Choir, the Training Choir, and the Alumni Chorus, James Litton, Music Director
- Mass & Vespers for the Feast of Holy Innocents (2000), LINN Records CKD 152, James Litton, music director; Members of the New York Collegium
- The Prayer Cycle by Jonathan Elias (1999), Sony SK60569, The American Boychoir with Alanis Morissette, James Taylor, Salif Keita, Perry Farrel and Nusrat Fateh Ali Kahn
- Fast Cats and Mysterious Cows (Songs from America) (1999), Virgin Classics 7243 5 45368 2 3, The American Boychoir with James Litton, music director; Patricia Petibon, Soprano; Catherine King, Mezzo-Soprano
- Christmastime (1998), Reunion Records 02341 0015 2, Michael W. Smith, The American Boychoir is featured on Track 3 Christmastime; Track 6 Medley: Sing We Now of Christmas; O Come O Come Emmanuel, Emmanuel; and Track 11 Carols Sing.
- Wide Awake (1998), Miramax, Original motion picture soundtrack composed by Edmund Choi
- Grace (1997), Sony Classical SK 62035, The American Boychoir with Kathleen Battle, The American Boychoir performs with Ms. Battle on Track 3, Mozart's Laudate Dominum.
- Sing! (1997), ABS Recordings E-2200, The American Boychoir, James Litton, Music Director
- Carol (1996), EMI CDC 7243 5 56180 2 3, The American Boychoir with the Albemarle Consort of Voices and orchestra, James Litton, Conductor
- In the Spirit (1996), Phillips 454 985–2, The American Boychoir with Jessye Norman, David Robertson, Conductor, The American Boychoir is heard on Away in a Manger, Of the father's Love Begotten and Mary Had a Baby.
- By Request (1996), EMI CDC 7243 5 55247, The American Boychoir, James Litton, music director, A collection of selections from The American Boychoir's tour programs performed either a capella or with piano.
- Hymn (1995), EMI CDC 55064 2 9, The American Boychoir with Stephen Curtis Chapman, Twila Paris, the Albemarle Consort of Voices, and the St. Luke's Chamber Ensemble, James Litton, music director, Orchestrated and arranged by Ron Huff and Tom Mitchell
- In Search of Angels (1994), Windham Hill Records 01934 11153–2, The American Boychoir featuring Patty Larkin, Jane Siberry, k.d. lang, Tim Story, and others, Soundtrack from PBS Special. Choir sings Jesus Christ, the Apple Tree.
- Interview with the Vampire (1994), Geffen GEFD 24719, Original motion picture soundtrack, composed by Elliot Goldenthal
- Lost in the Stars (1992), MusicMasters Classics 01612-67100-2, American Boychoir Chorister Jamal Howard sings the role of Alex in this recorded revival of the passionate musical based on Alan Paton's Cry, the Beloved Country, Julius Rudel, Conductor of the Orchestra of St. Luke's.
- A Carnegie Hall Christmas Concert (1992), SONY Classical SK 48235, The American Boychoir featuring Kathleen Battle, Frederica von Stade, Wynton Marsalis, André Previn, Conductor of the Orchestra of St. Luke's
- Trumpets Sound, Voices Ring (1991), MusicMasters 523153F, The American Boychoir with the Atlantic Brass Quintet, William Trafka, Organ; Thomas Goeman, Piano and Harpsichord, James Litton, Music Director
- Trumpets Sound, Voices Ring (single CD version) (1991), MusicMasters 01612-67076-2, The American Boychoir, James Litton, Music Director
- Dixit Dominus (1991), MusicMasters 01612-67084-2, The American Boychoir with the Albemarle Consort of Voices, and the Eighteenth Century Ensemble, James Litton, Music Director
- Hymnody of Earth (1990), MusicMasters 01612-67058-2, A ceremony of songs for choir, hammer dulcimer and percussion composed and arranged by Malcolm Dalglish (b. 1953) with inspiration and lyrics from Wendell Berry
- The American Boychoir On Tour (1990), Ocaso HR006CD, The American Boychoir; Thomas Goeman and Wallace Hornady, Piano, James Litton, Conductor, Selections from The American Boychoir tour repertoire
- Leonard Bernstein, Chichester Psalms; Charles Davidson, I Never Saw Another Butterfly (1988), Music Heritage Society MHC 312514Y, The American Boychoir with The American Symphony Orchestra
- The American Boychoir with Jessye Norman – Christmastide (1987), Philips 420 180–2, released on video, The American Boychoir with the New York Choral Society and the Empire Chamber Ensemble, Robert De Cormier, Conductor
- On Christmas Day (1987), Ocaso HR002, The American Boychoir with the Cathedral Symphony Orchestra and the New York Vocal Consort, James Litton, Conductor
- Go West Young Man, Michael W. Smith (1990), The American Boychoir and other choirs, Reunion Records
- Britten Ceremony of Carols (1983), Pro Arte Digital, The American Boychoir with Ruth Negri, Harp; Harriett Wintergreen, Piano; Paul-Martin Maki, Organ, John Kuzma, Music Director
- This is my Country (1983), Pro Arte Digital, The American Boychoir, John Kuzma, Music Director
- Messiah (1981), Smithsonian Collection, The American Boychoir with Smithsonian Chamber Players and Normal Scribner Chorus, conducted by James Weaver. Soloists: Carole Bogarde (soprano), Elvira Green (alto), Jeffrey Gall (counter-tenor), Charles Bressler (tenor), and Leslie Guinn (bass)., Performed on original instruments; the only American men-and-boys recording of Handel's Messiah
- Benjamin Britten War Requiem (1975), Kalvier Records, The American Boychoir with The William Hall Chorale and Vienna Festival Symphony Orchestra, William Hall, Conductor, First American recording
- Felix Mendelssohn Elijah (1970), RCA Red Seal, The Columbus Boychoir with The Philadelphia Orchestra, Shirley Verrett, Soprano; Richard Lewis, Bass; Eugene Ormandy, Conductor., Robert Haley, Director, Recorded April 8–9, 1969. Released September 1970.
- Leonard Bernstein Kaddish Symphony, Private Label (1966), The Columbus Boychoir, Donald Bryant, Music Director
- Columbus Boychoir School 25th Anniversary Concert, June 5, 1965 (1965), Private issue, The Columbus Boychoir, Donald Bryant, music director, Live concert recording, Westminster Choir College
- Columbus Boychoir Christmas Concert, December 1964 (1964), Private issue, The Columbus Boychoir, Donald Bryant, music director, Live concert recordings, Alexander Hall (Princeton), 12-inch LP recordings of excerpts from Christmas portion of Handel's Messiah (+Hallelujah), 10-inch LP recording of Christmas carols
- Firestone presents Your Favorite Christmas Carols (1963), Columbus Boychoir with Risë Stevens, Brian Sullivan, and the Firestone Orchestra and Chorus, Donald Bryant, director
- Family Christmas Favorites, c. 1962, Decca, The Columbus Boychoir with Bing Crosby, Donald Bryant, Conductor
- The Columbus Boychoir, c. 1962, Donald Bryant, Music Director
- Christmastime, c. 1960, Decca, The Columbus Boychoir with other choirs, Donald Bryant, conductor
- Singing for the Joy of It (1961), Decca DL 74135, The Columbus Boychoir, Donald Bryant, Music Director
- Joy to the World, c. 1960, Decca DL 78920, The Columbus Boychoir, Donald Bryant, Music Director
- The Columbus Boychoir, c. 1960, Gothic, The Columbus Boychoir with the Princeton Chamber Orchestra, Nicholas Harsanyi, Conductor; Joanna Richard, Soprano; Rachel Armstrong, Alto, Donald Bryant, Conductor
- Festival of Song (1955), Decca DL 8106, The Columbus Boychoir, Herbert Huffman, Music Director
- Arrigo Boito Mephistofele “Prologue” (1954), RCA, The Columbus Boychoir with the NBC Symphony Orchestra, Arturo Toscanini, Conductor; Nicola Moscona, Bass., Herbert Huffman, Conductor, Taken from the broadcast of March 14 (1954)
- Amahl and the Night Visitors, Original Cast of the NBC telecast (1951), RCA 6485-2-RG, American Boychoir chorister Chet Allen
- The Lord’s Prayer; O Holy Night, c. 1950, RCA Victor, The Columbus Boychoir, Herbert Huffman, conductor
- Favorite Christmas Carols, c. 1947, The Columbus Boychoir, Herbert Huffman, Music Director
- The Columbus Boychoir – May 6, 1947, concert, Herbert Huffman, Music Director

== Notable alumni ==
- Van Dyke Parks, American composer, arranger, record producer, instrumentalist, singer-songwriter, author, and actor
- Douglas Ahlstedt, operatic tenor
- Chet Allen, child actor and singer
- Anton Armstrong, choral conductor
- Greg Lyne, American choral conductor, arranger, composer, and vocal educator
- Cameron Carpenter, organist
- David Karsten Daniels, singer songwriter
- Lawrence Lessig, academic and political activist
- James Westman, baritone
