= Trinity Schools =

Private schools in the United States

Trinity Schools are private Christian schools in the United States providing a classical Christian education to students in grades 7–12. They were founded by the People of Praise and are independent schools owned and operated by Trinity Schools, Inc. Jon Balsbaugh serves as president of all the schools.

== Locations ==
Trinity Schools are currently located in three places:

- Greenlawn, in South Bend, Indiana.
- Meadow View, in Falls Church, Virginia.
- River Ridge, in Eagan, Minnesota.

=== Member schools ===
- Wilberforce School (Princeton Junction, New Jersey)
- Trinity Academy (Portland, Oregon)

In 2014, Trinity entered a partnership with the Wilberforce School to allow the later to license Trinity's upper school curriculum for its new high school and receive ongoing teacher training. This partnership named Wilberforce the first Trinity Member School. Trinity Schools' second member school affiliate was Trinity Academy in Portland, Oregon.

== Curriculum ==
Trinity Schools takes a classical education approach. Students are taught the Latin Language for the first four years and take either French, German, Koine Greek or Spanish for two years. They are taught math courses for all six years. Students take Drama in their junior and senior years, and perform for the school. Students are taught music for four years. Students take art from 6th grade all the way to the 12th. They study Scripture for four years, and study the doctrine of their own denomination for one year. In high school, they take a daily class for two hours called Humane Letters. In Humane Letters, students study history, literature, and philosophy.

== Views on sexuality ==
The schools teach that sexual activity is only proper between a lawfully-wedded couple, and that marriage is only between a man and a woman. The schools insist that their students are not allowed to discuss their sexuality, and finds it unwise for teenagers to interpret same-sex attractions as identity-defining. The schools have been accused of discriminating against LGBTQ people, effectively barring admission to children of same-sex parents and making it clear that openly gay and lesbian teachers are not welcome.

== Notable people ==
United States Supreme Court Justice Amy Coney Barrett served on the board of the organization from July 2015 to March 2017.
