= Trinity School at Greenlawn =

Private Christian school in South Bend, Indiana

Coordinates: 41°40′26″N 86°15′55″W

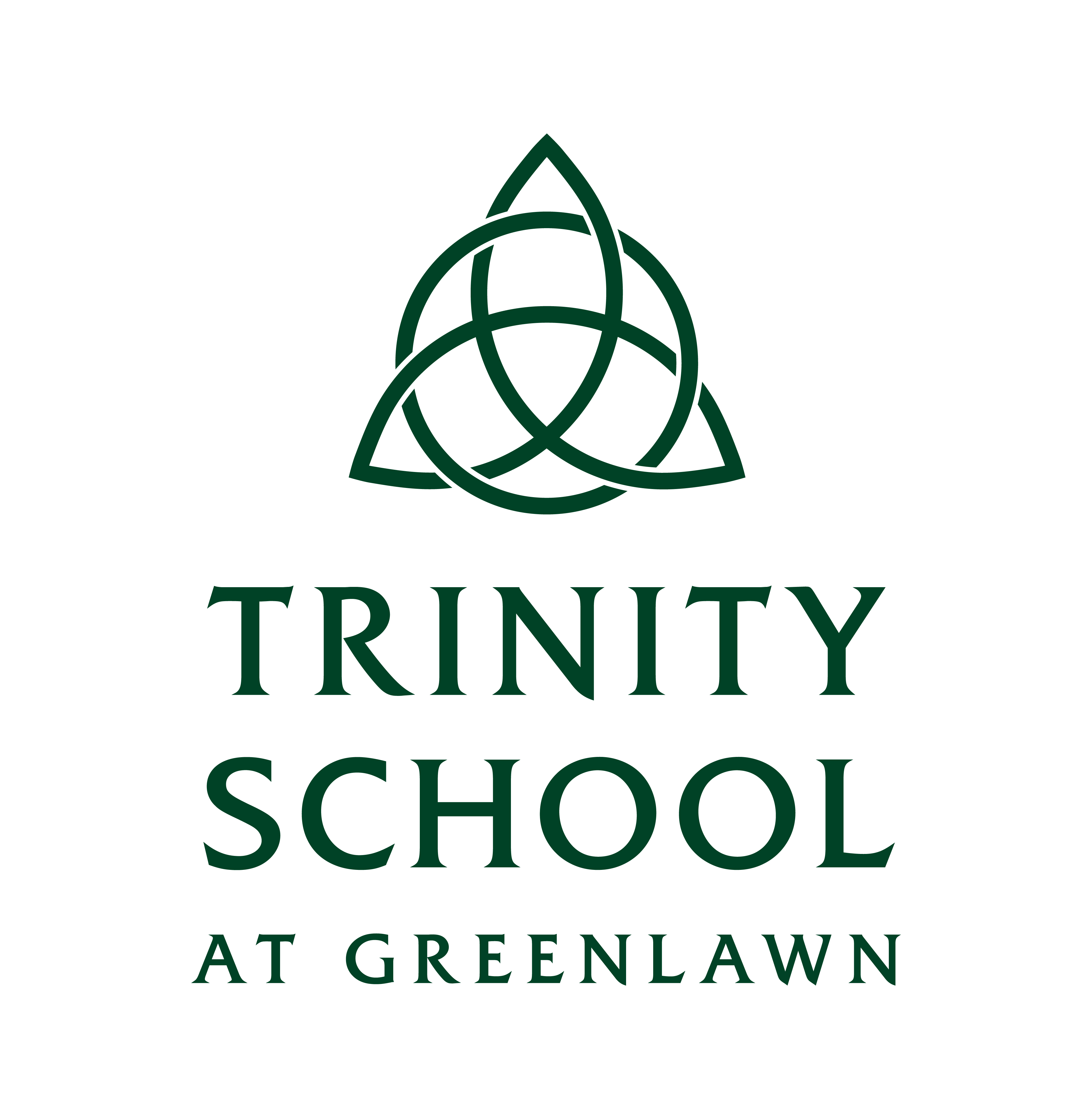

Location
- 1024 Thomas Street., South Bend, IN, 46601; South Bend, St. Joseph County, Indiana 46601; United States

Information
- Type: Private Christian
- Motto: Verum, Bonum, Pulchrum
- Established: 1981
- Principal: Mary Frances Loughran
- Faculty: 9
- Grades: 6-12
- Enrollment: 240 (2023-2024)
- Color
- Team name: Titans
- Website: trinitygreenlawn.org

Trinity School at Greenlawn is a private Christian school located in South Bend, Indiana that has grades 6–12. It was founded by the People of Praise in 1981 with fewer than 30 students, making it one of the first classical Christian schools.

Trinity School attracts students from northwest Indiana and southwest Michigan, as well as international students. Located at 107 South Greenlawn Avenue in South Bend, Indiana, it is accredited by the Independent School Association of the Central States (ISACS).

Trinity School at Greenlawn historically had two sister schools, Trinity School at River Ridge (Eagan, Minnesota) and Trinity School at Meadow View (Falls Church, Virginia). The schools were independent and are owned and operated together by Trinity Schools, Inc.

In March 2025, Trinity Schools, Inc. announced that it was ceasing operations of the Trinity School at Meadow View campus in Falls Church, VA. In July 2025, the school announced that it was relocating its Trinity School at Greenlawn Campus to the former St. Stephens School building located at 1024 Thomas Street in South Bend. Trinity School at River Ridge and Trinity School at Greenlawn remain affiliated.

Mary Frances Loughran is the head of school at the Greenlawn campus.

== Classes ==
The curriculum at Trinity School at Greenlawn includes a 6-year writing course and a 4-year Latin course.

== Athletics ==
Trinity School at Greenlawn's mascot is the Titans. The sports for girls are soccer and basketball. The sports for boys are soccer and basketball. Co-ed Track and Field and cross country are also available. Greenlawn has posted its best records in boys' basketball and girls' soccer. The school's home games are normally located at the Trinity School Athletic Center. Greenlawn has also hosted golf, fencing and boxing.

== Facilities ==
Trinity School at Greenlawn formerly occupied part of a complex of buildings initially named Elm Court, site of the c. 1914 home of Clement Studebaker Jr. and his family. Studebaker sold the property to Vincent Bendix. Bendix never resided in the mansion, preferring to live in Chicago, but he renovated parts of the building. In the late 1940s the Sisters of St. Joseph of the Third Order of St. Francis purchased the site for use as their motherhouse. The sisters preserved the original mansion, with renovations, and added a new three-story building adjacent to the mansion with a chapel, classrooms and residence space for the order's members. When their ministries shifted geographically away from Indiana, the sisters relocated their motherhouse. The People of Praise community acquired the property in August, 1982, for dual use by Trinity School and by the community's international headquarters. At that point the school became known as Trinity School at Greenlawn, with reference to the address on Greenlawn Avenue. Though there is some overlap, People of Praise offices are situated in the original mansion, and Trinity School leased space in the parts of the building constructed by the sisters.

In July 2025, the school announced that it would be relocating to the former St. Stephens School building at 1024 Thomas Street on the Near West Side of South Bend.
