= Studebaker-Packard Hawk series =

Series of cars

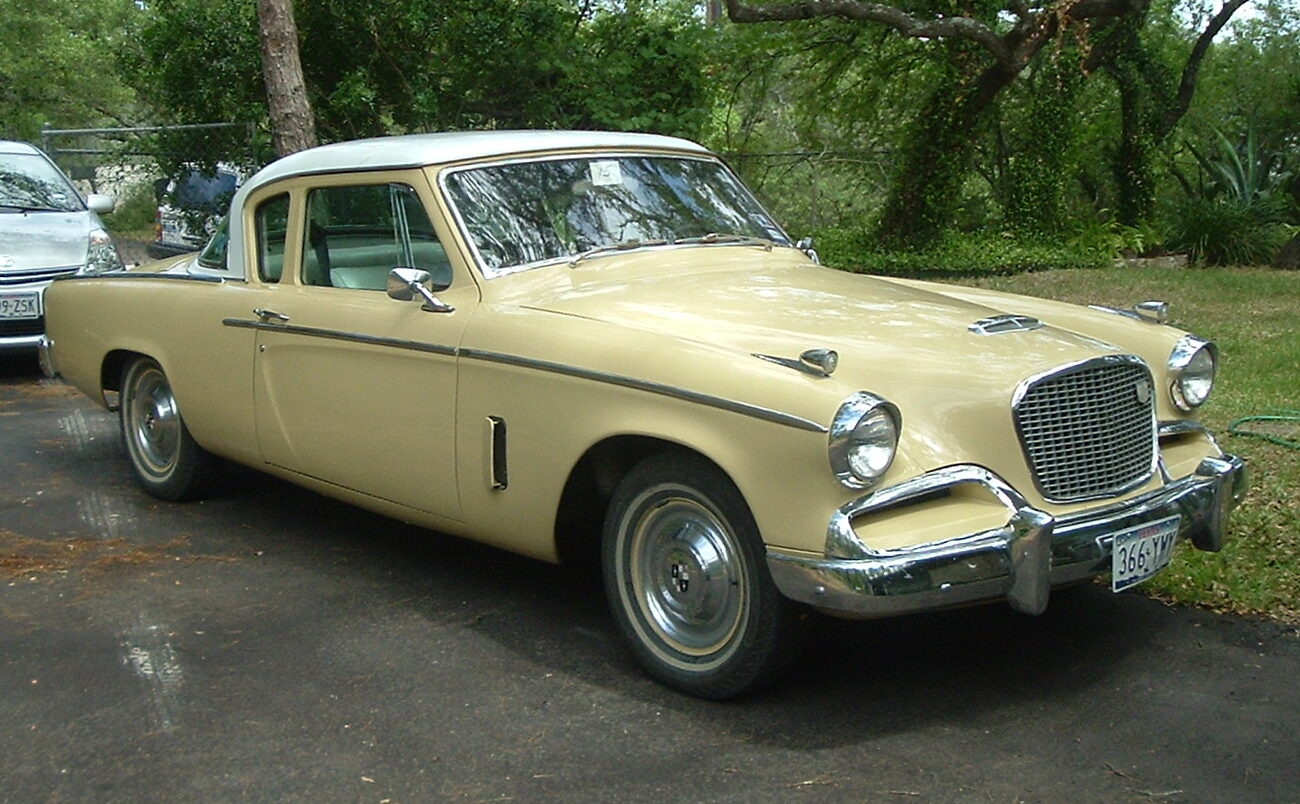
- 1956 Studebaker Flight Hawk

Overview
- Manufacturer: Studebaker
- Production: 1956 to 1964

Body and chassis
- Body style: 2-door coupe
- Layout: FR layout

The Studebaker-Packard Hawk series were cars produced by the merged Studebaker-Packard corporation between 1956 and 1964. All but the 1958 Packard Hawk were badged Studebaker. Described by the company as "family sports cars", they were all two-door, four-seat coupes or hardtops. They were an evolution of the long wheelbase (120") 1953 C/K models designed by Robert Bourke, lead designer with the Raymond Loewy Agency. The 1962 redesign as the Grand Turismo Hawk was by another famed stylist, Brooks Stevens.

The precursor of the Hawks was the 1955 Studebaker Speedster, a special edition hardtop based on the Studebaker President with stainless steel trim above the rear window, usually fog lights on the front bumper, deluxe leather interior, a special dash and unique two tone paint combinations. The success of the Speedster led to the expanded line of 1956 Hawks as a competitor to the Ford Thunderbird and the Oldsmobile Starfire.

Timeline of the Hawk models
Model	1956	1957	1958	1959	1960	1961	1962	1963	1964
Flight Hawk	X
Power Hawk	X
Sky Hawk	X
Golden Hawk	X	X	X
Silver Hawk		X	X	X
Packard Hawk			X
Hawk					X	X
Gran Turismo Hawk							X	X	X

The four-model Hawk range launched in 1956, mirrored the engine and trim levels of the sedans. There were two coupes; the Flight Hawk was a base model powered by Champion's obsolete and underpowered flathead straight-6 enlarged to 185.6 cubic inch; the Power Hawk used Studebaker's mid-level OHV 259 cu. in. with either 180 hp (130 kW) 2-bbl or 195 hp (145 kW) with a 4-bbl in (4.7 L) V8 from the Commander; there were two hardtops; the Sky Hawk shared the larger OHV 289 in^{3} V8 and luxury trim with the Studebaker President, and Studebaker Golden Hawk, which stood at the top of the range. Some feel that by installing the largest V8, the big-block 352 cubic inch 275 hp (5.8 L), in the smallest, lightest body, Studebaker created the first muscle car eight years before the GTO. It had the second highest power-to-weight ratio of any American production car. Contemporary road tests verified the Golden Hawk was faster/quicker in the 1/4 mile than the Corvette, Thunderbird and Chrysler 300B. In top speed, only the Chrysler 300B could equal it.

By 1956, Studebaker-Packard's financial condition had deteriorated to the point where there was no choice but to discontinue all manufacturing in the Packard facilities. Packard's Detroit factory and Utica proving grounds were closed. In a stop-gap effort to buy time for the development and financing of an all-new Packard, and to honor existing dealer contracts, a 1957 Packard that was merely a dressed up Studebaker President went into production at Studebaker's factory in South Bend. As Packard's V8 was no longer being produced, the new Packard as well as the 1957 Golden Hawk were fitted with Studebaker's largest 289 in^{3} V8, equipped with a McCulloch supercharger to produce the same 275 hp (205 kW) rated power output as the 1956 Packard V8. The range was simplified; the Sky Hawk was discontinued as too close to the Golden Hawk, while the two lowest models were replaced with a single Silver Hawk model, available with either the Champion straight-6 or 259 cubic inch (4.2 L) V8. 1958 saw a restyled and re-badged luxury version of the Golden Hawk sold as the Packard Hawk.

Studebaker sales continued a rapid decline in 1957–58, so for 1959 Studebaker-Packard discontinued the hardtop Golden Hawk, all Packards, and the Studebaker sedans; the Silver Hawk coupe was the only holdover left alongside the new Studebaker Lark range. It was a make-or-break year, but Studebaker's big gamble paid off; the smaller-appearing Lark was actually just the six-year-old sedans with a shorter wheelbase and abbreviated front and rear sheetmetal, but it was in the right place at the right time, a car the market wanted. The Silver Hawk served as a useful showroom draw, and it was continued; since it was the only Hawk model left, it was renamed simply the Studebaker Hawk and continued under that name through the end of 1961.

For the 1962 model year Brooks Stevens restyled the Hawk and it was re-launched as the Gran Turismo Hawk. Its styling was well received, and sold relatively well for 1962. By 1963, Studebaker sales were in an irreversible death spiral. Even though the 1964 Super Hawk, available with an optional R2 supercharged engine, 4-speed transmission, TwinTraction limited-slip differential, front disc brakes and a sport suspension, was the best Hawk ever, production was ended with the rest of Studebaker's US production in December 1963.

== Gallery ==
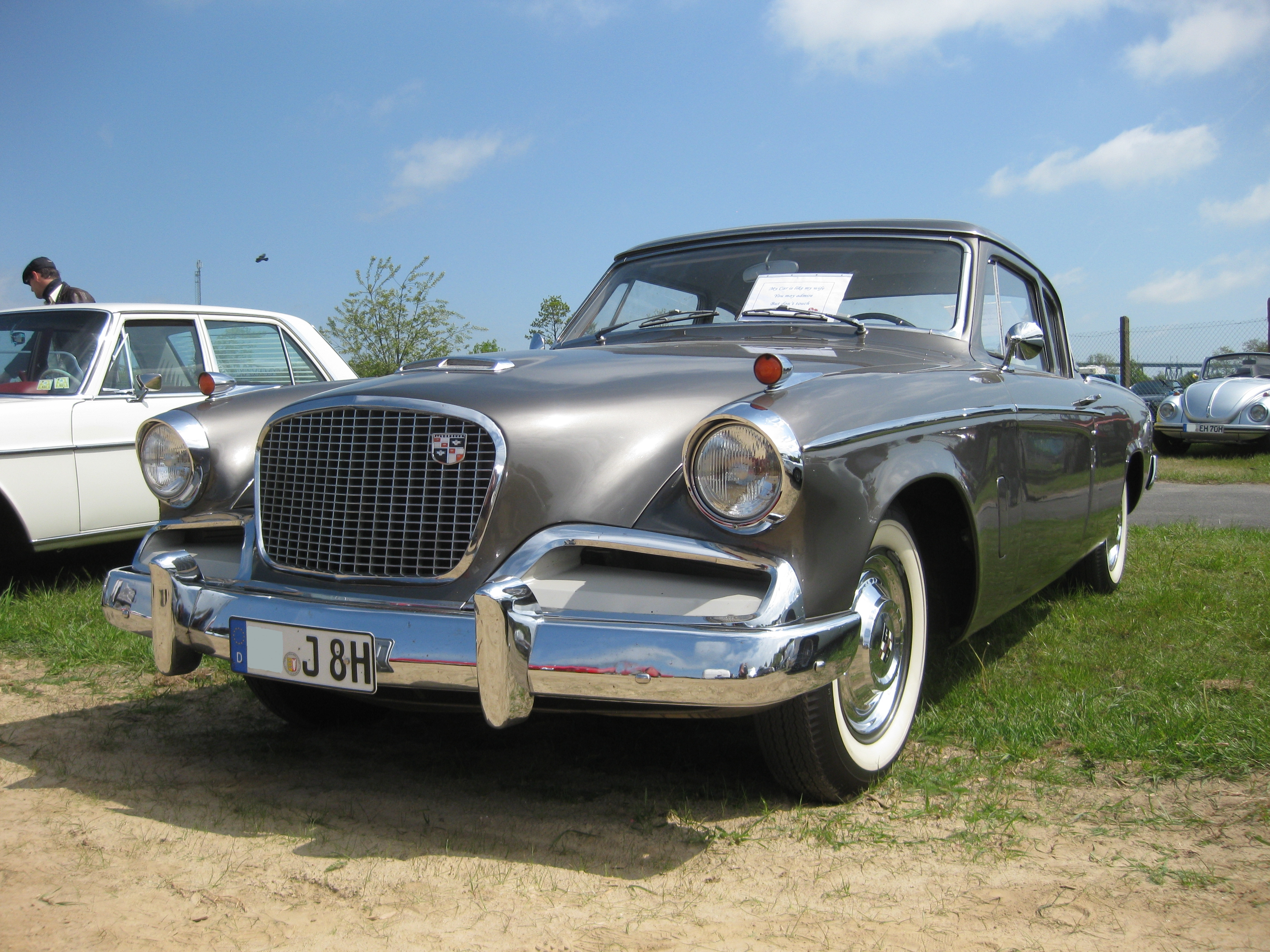
1956 Studebaker Flight Hawk

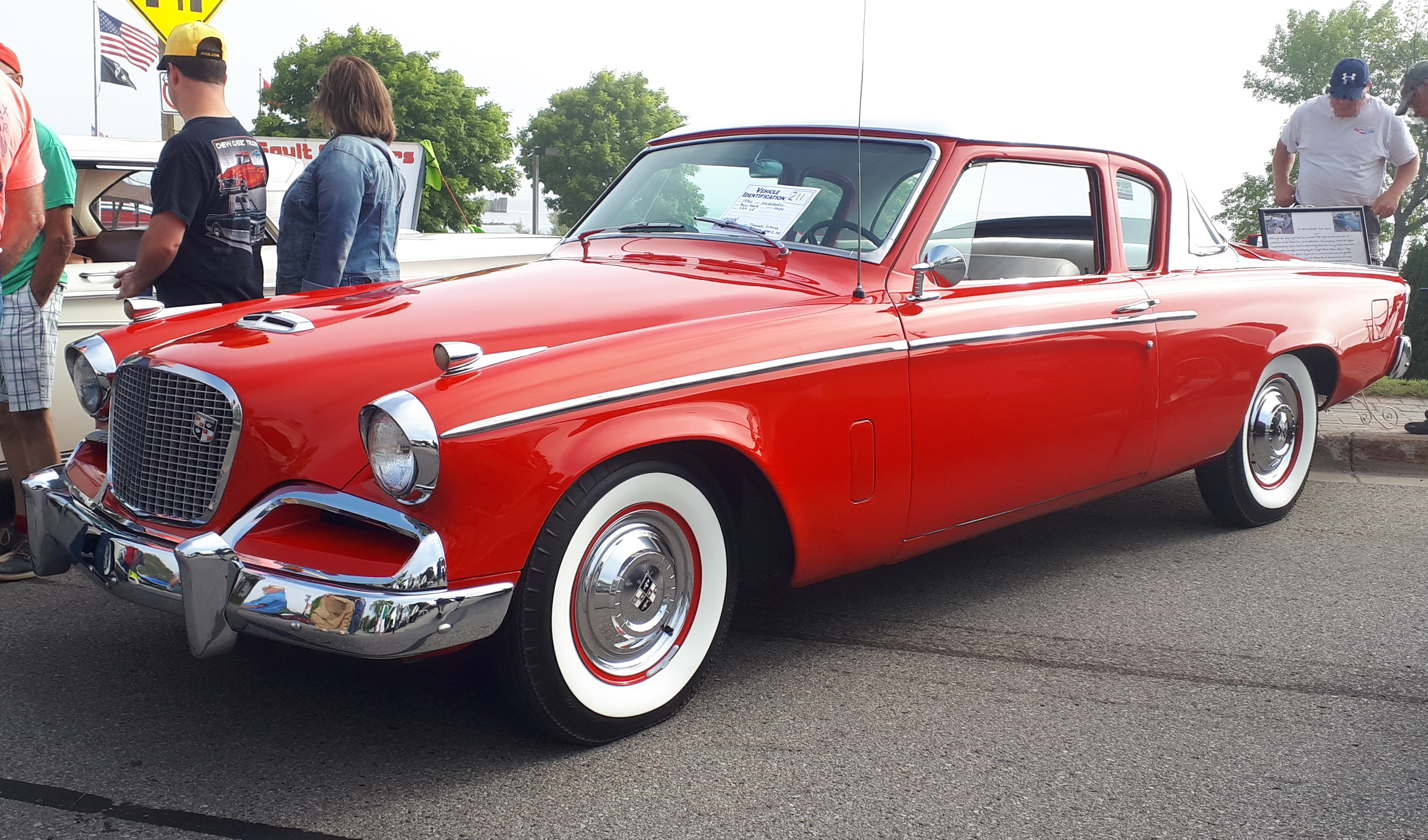
1956 Studebaker Power Hawk

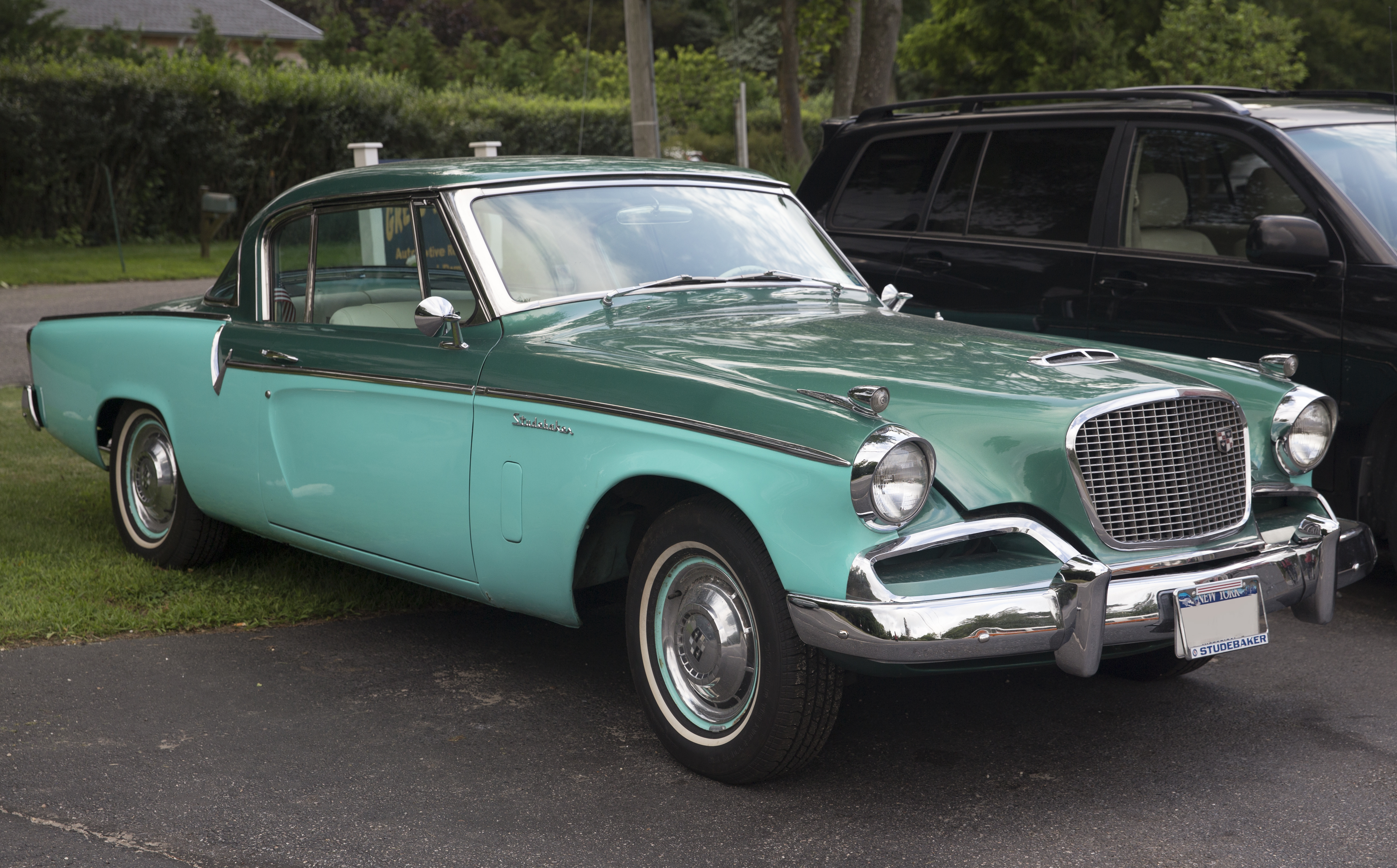
1956 Studebaker Sky Hawk

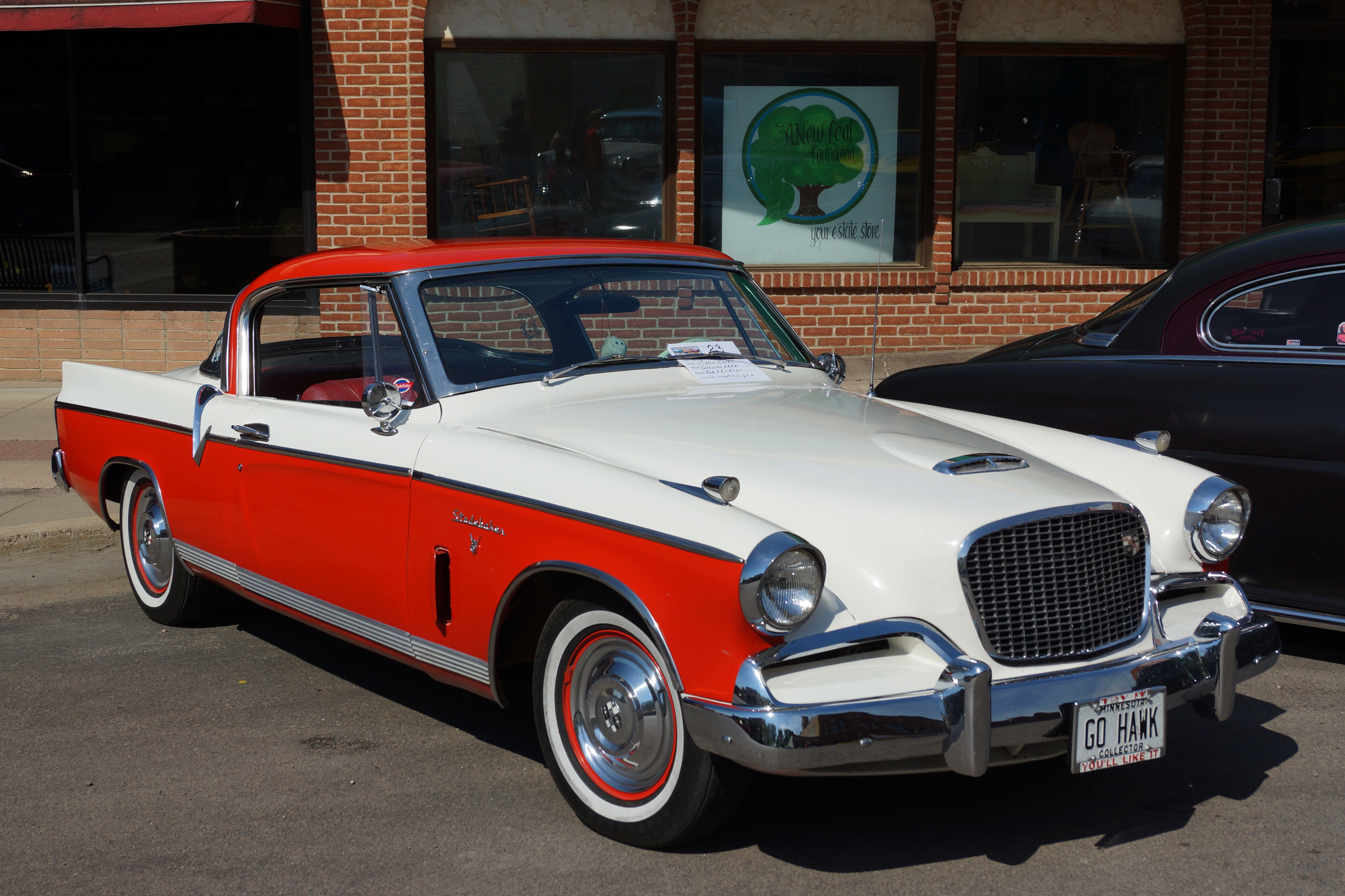
1956 Studebaker Golden Hawk

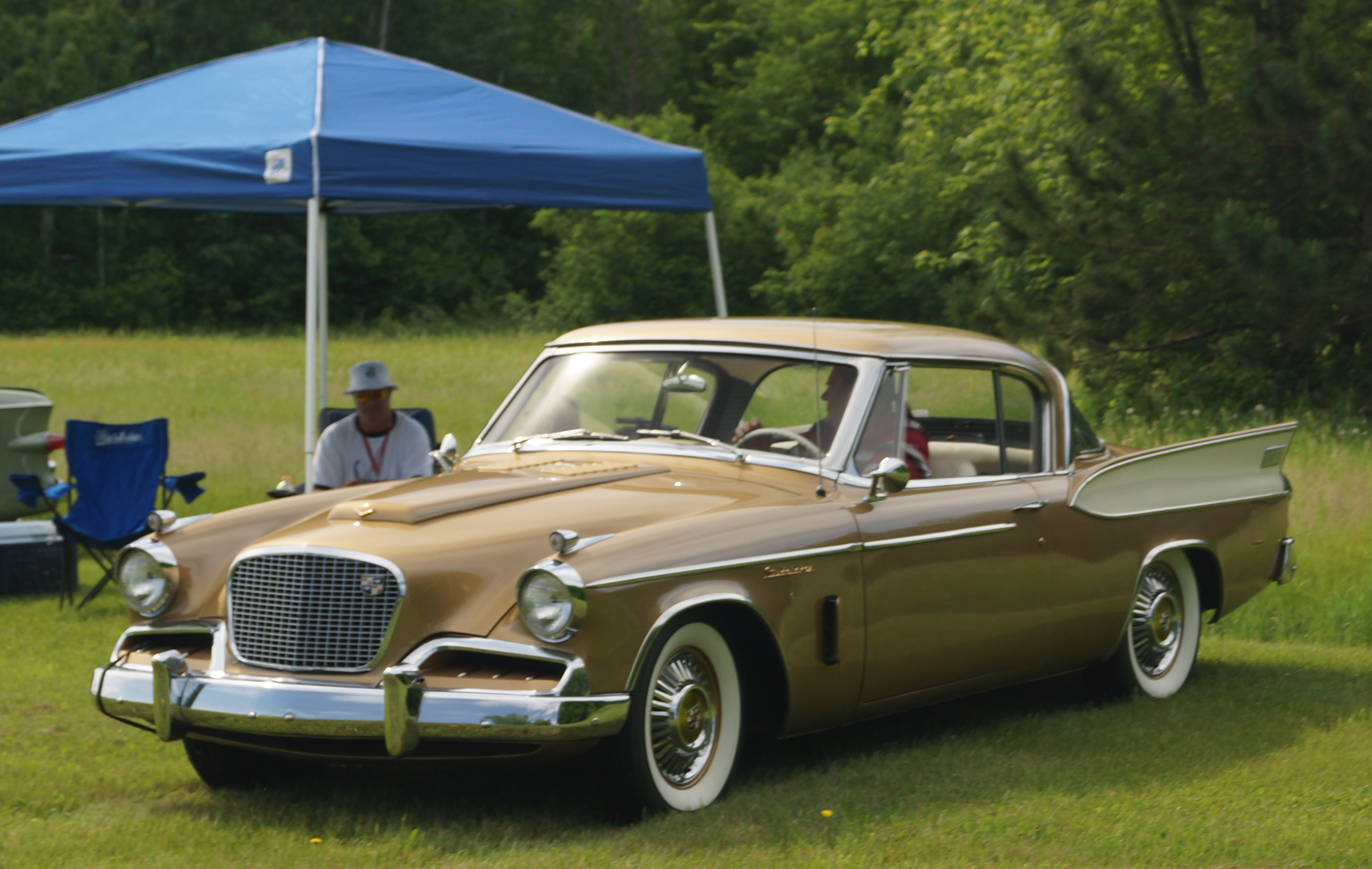
1957 Studebaker Golden Hawk

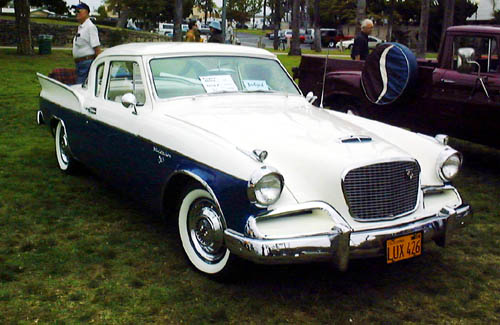
1957 Studebaker Silver Hawk

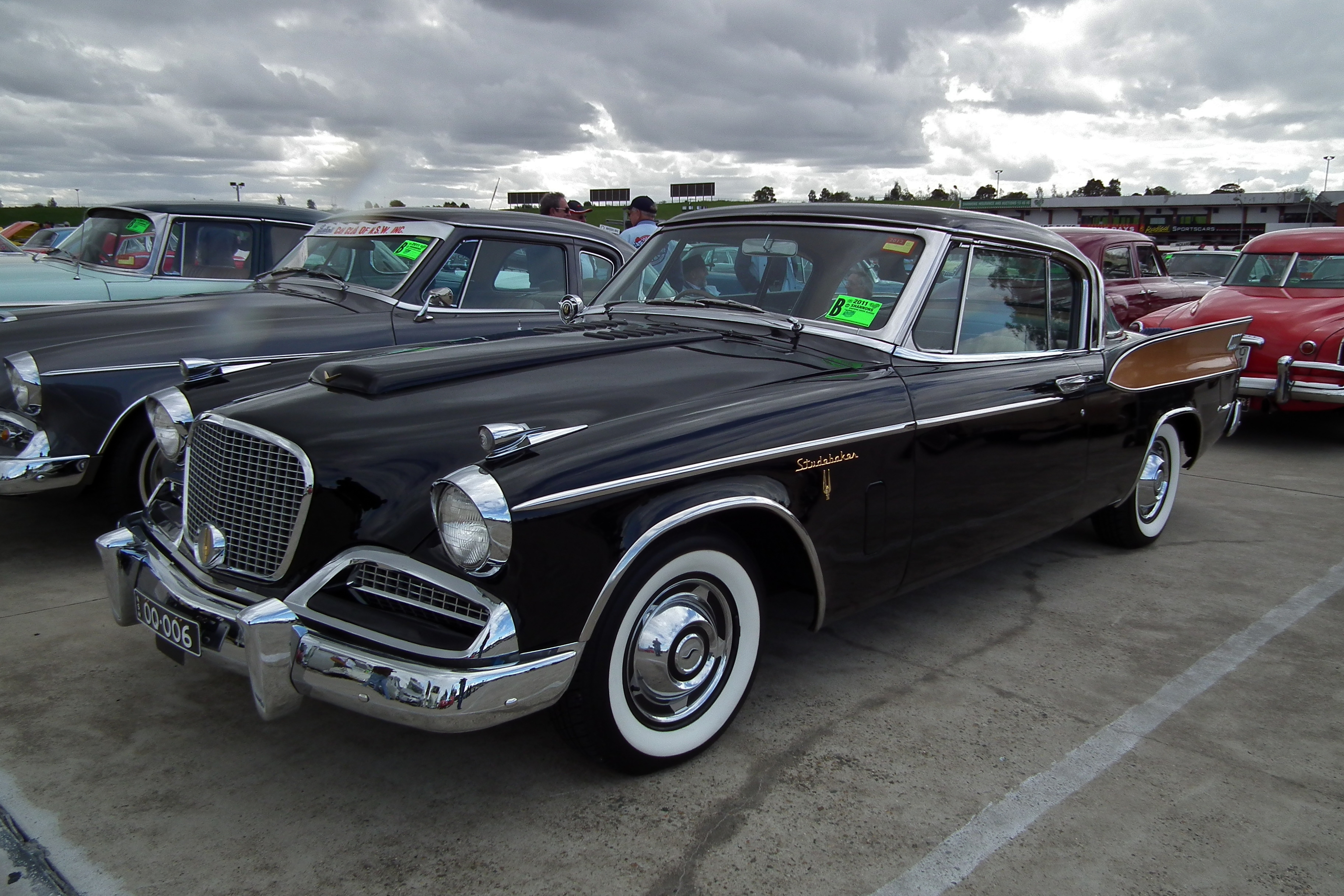
1958 Studebaker Golden Hawk

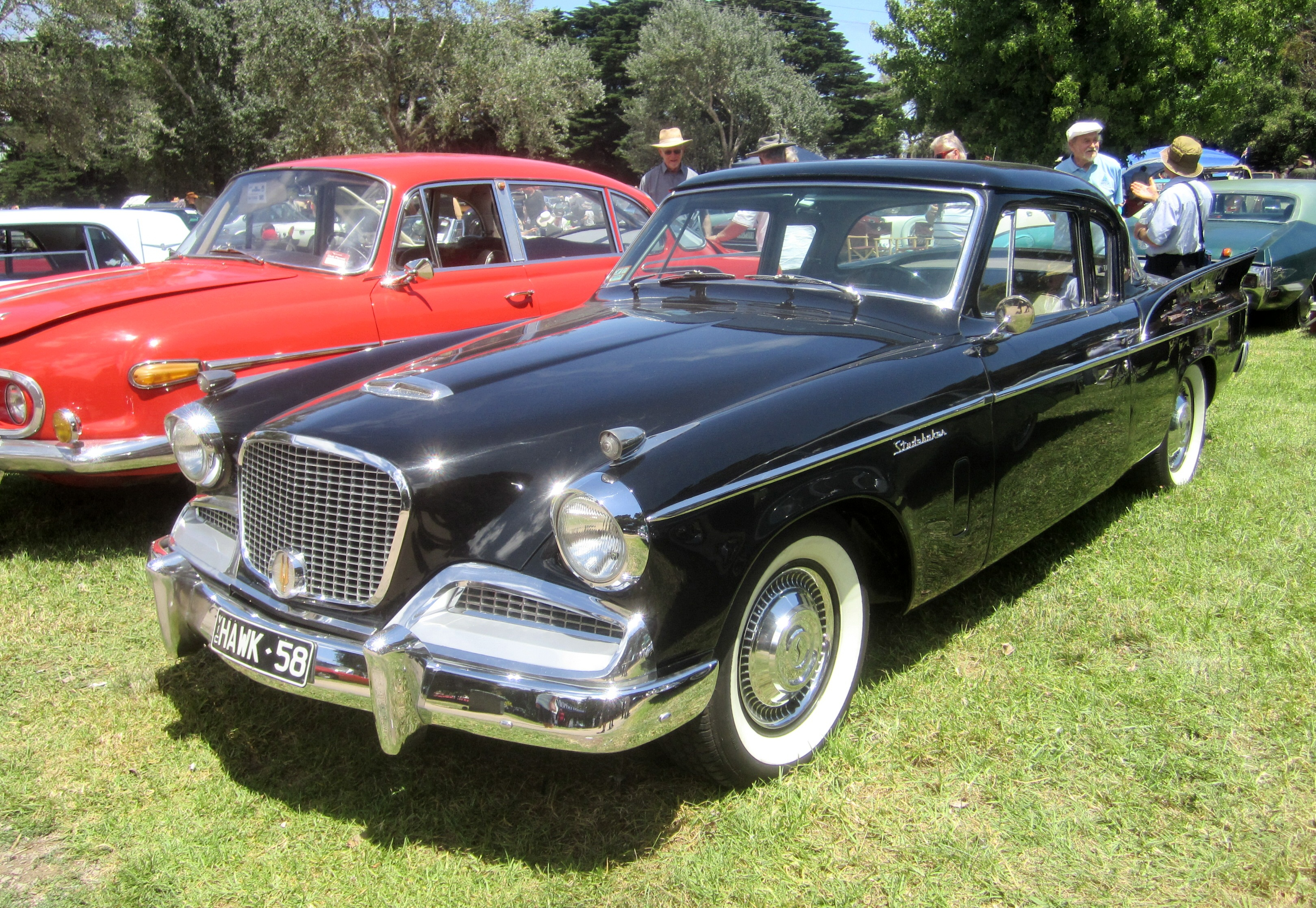
1958 Studebaker Silver Hawk

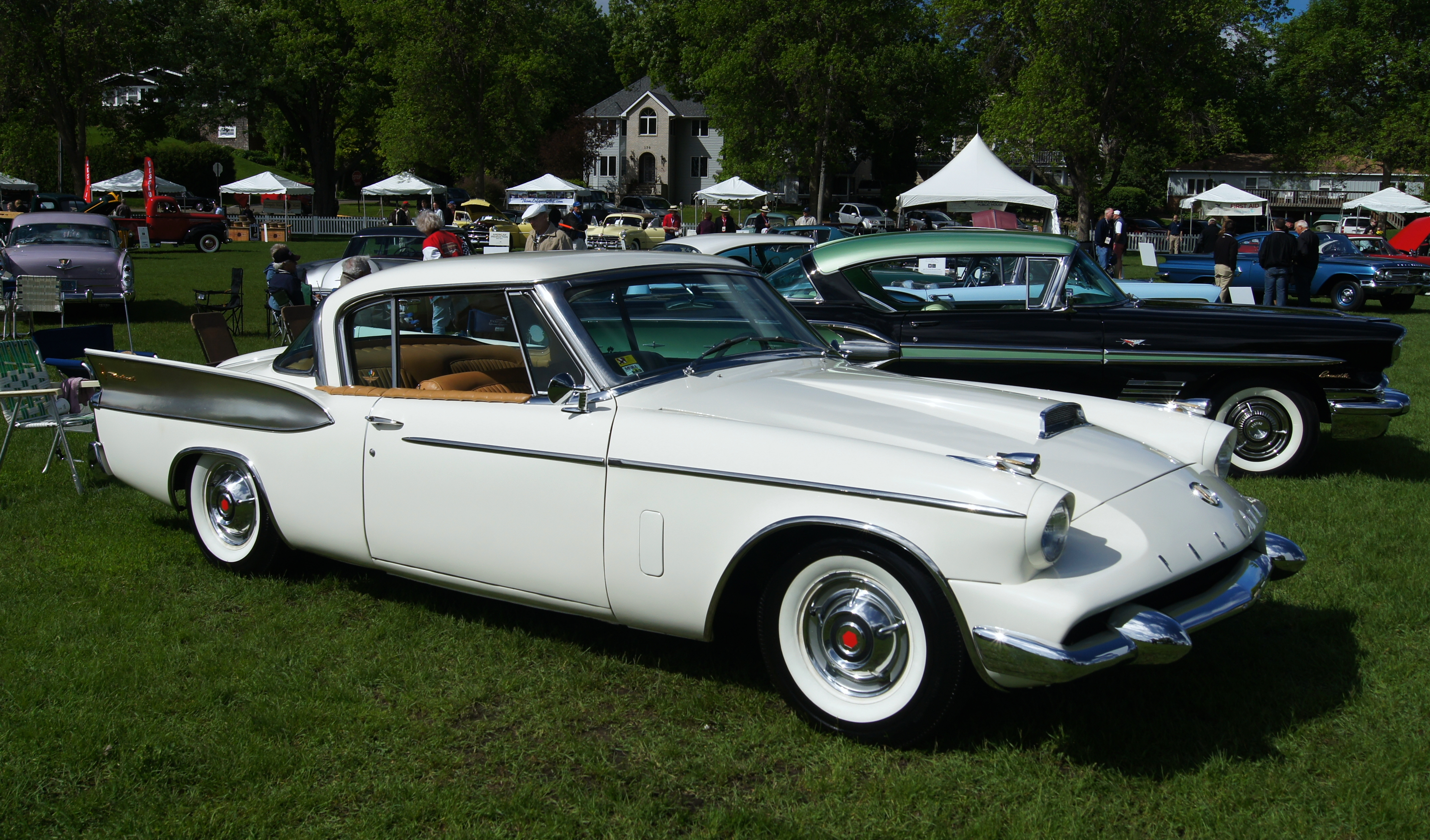
1958 Packard Hawk

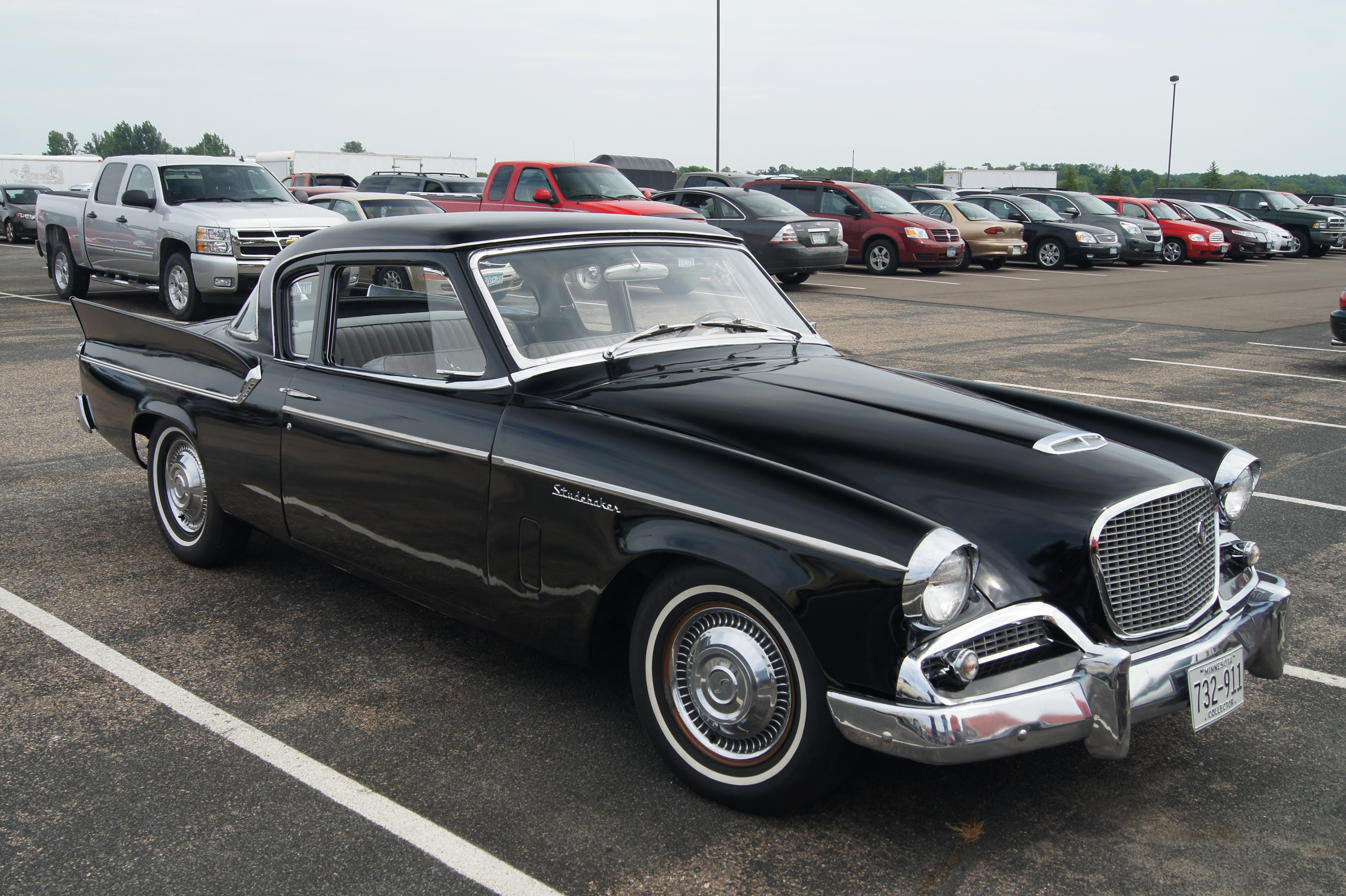
1959 Studebaker Silver Hawk

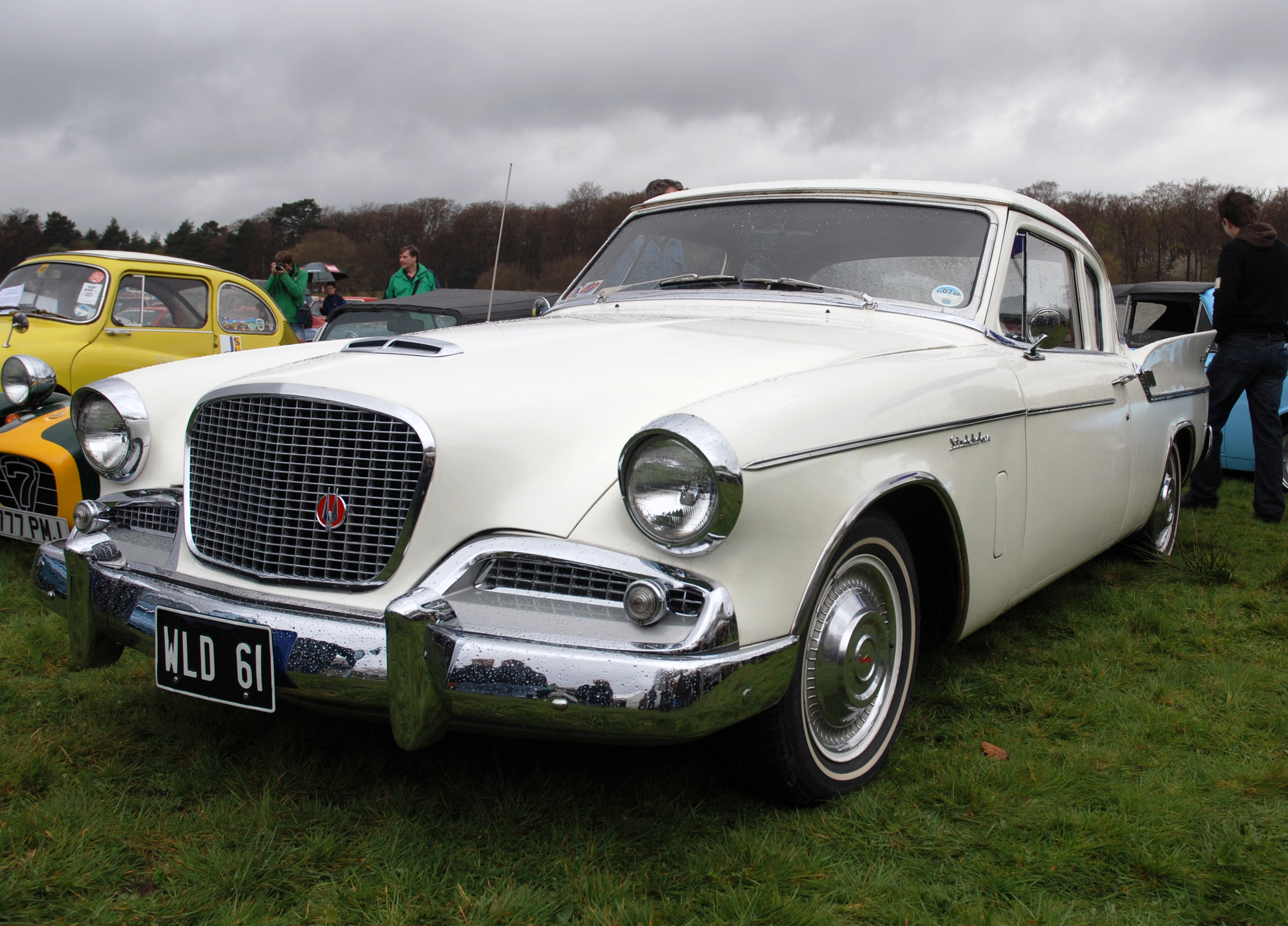
1960 Studebaker Hawk

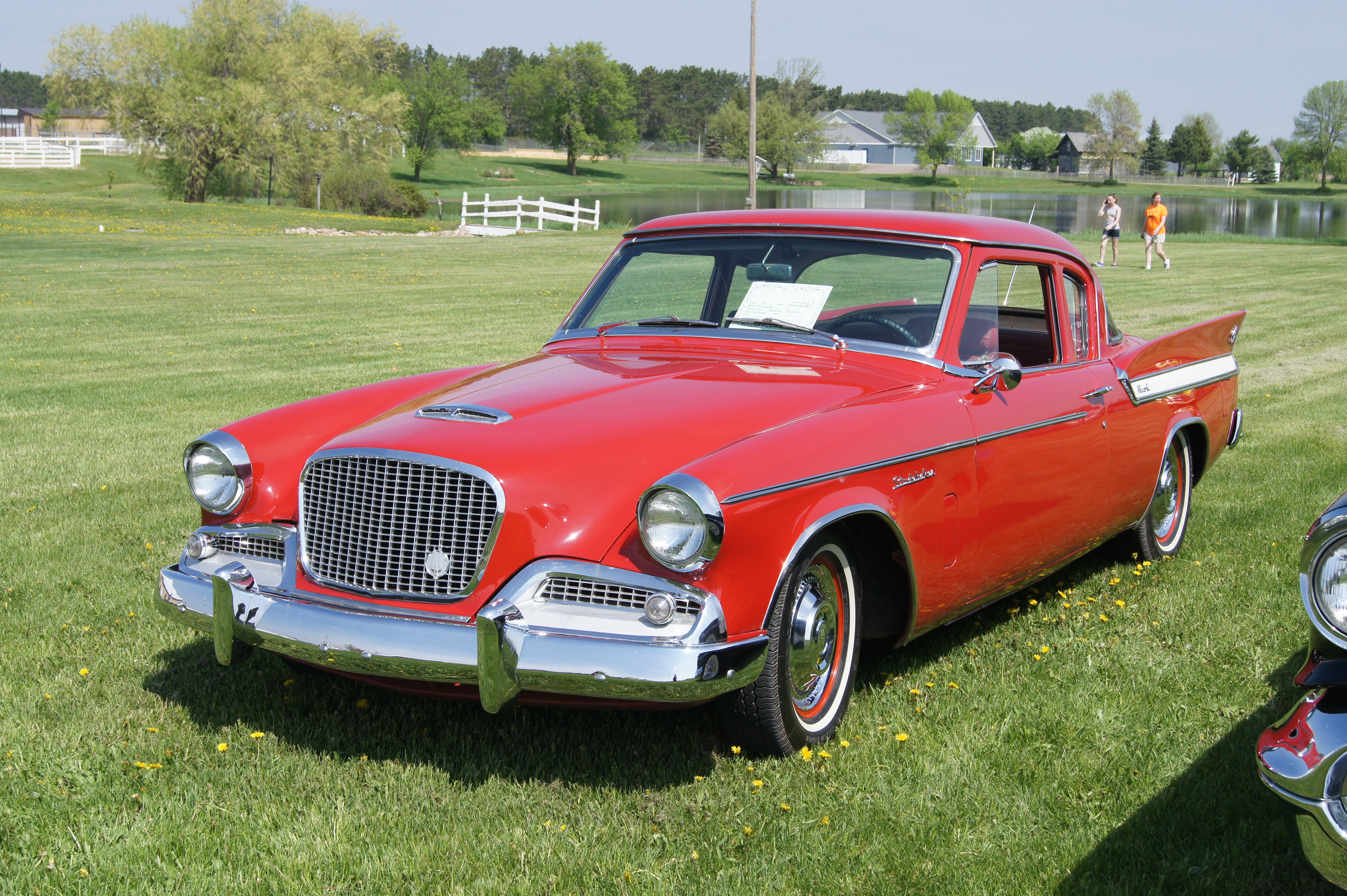
1961 Studebaker Hawk

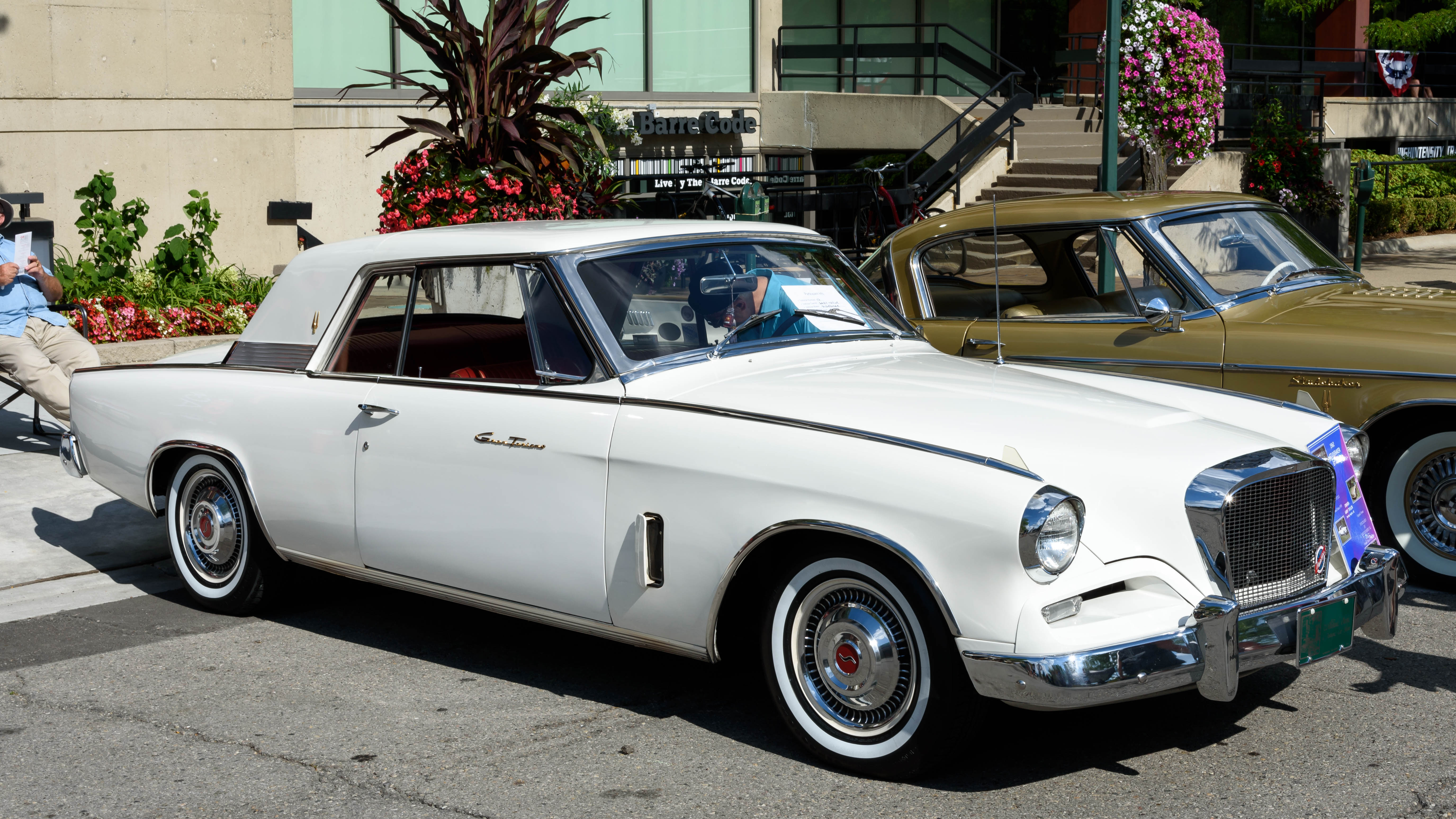
1962 Studebaker Grand Turismo Hawk

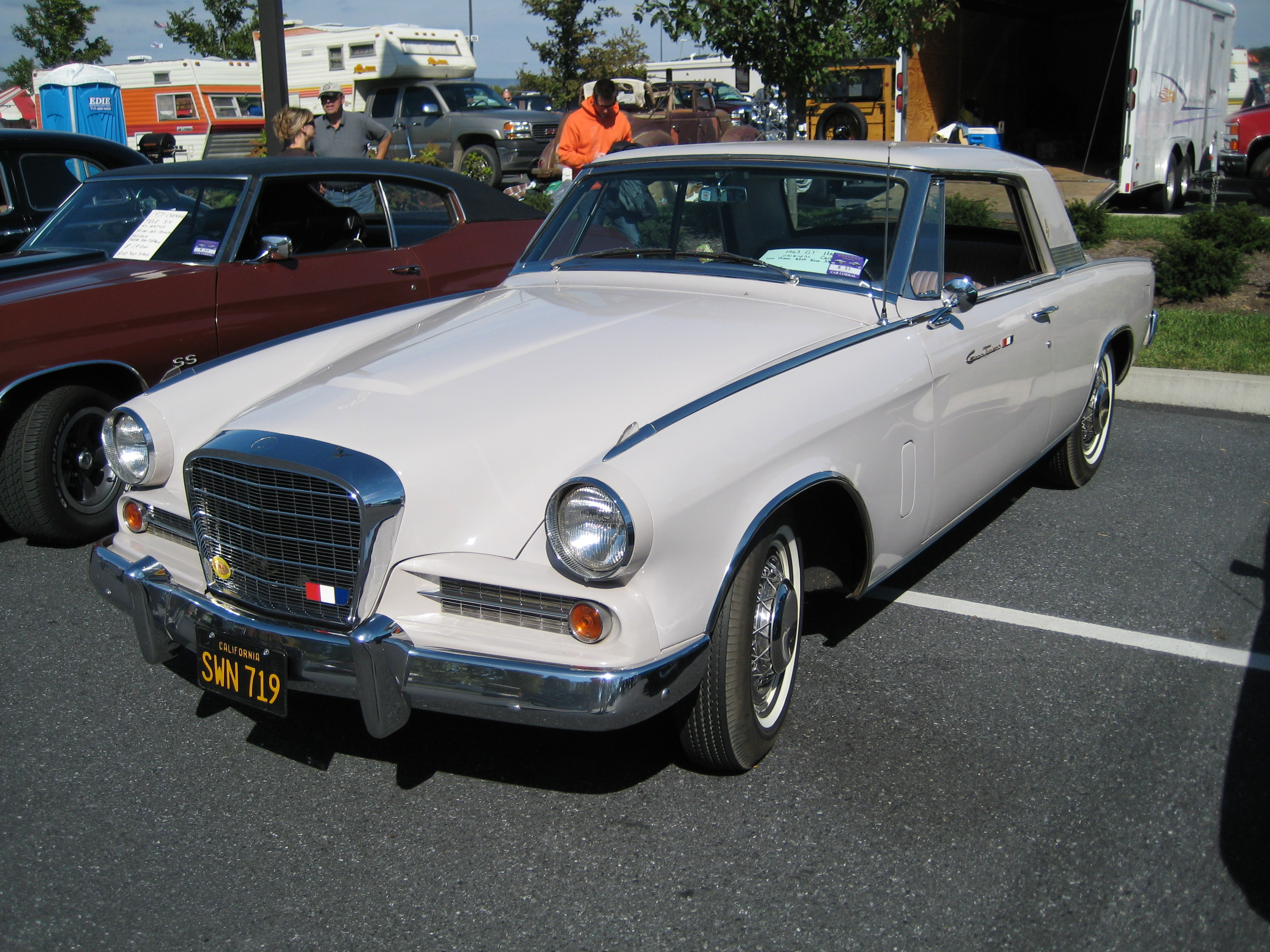
1963 Studebaker Grand Turismo Hawk

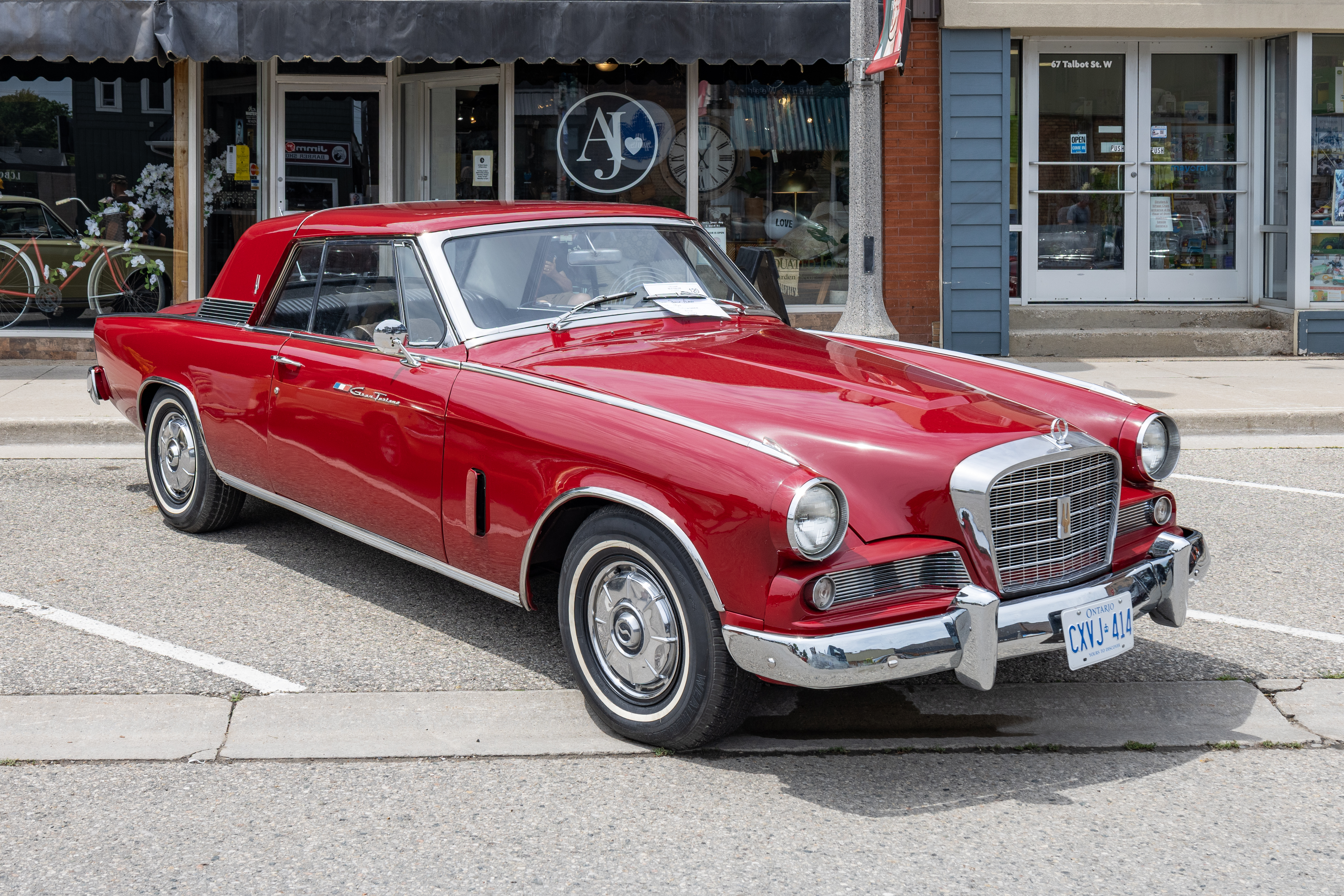
1964 Studebaker Gran Turismo Hawk
