= Studebaker Sky Hawk =

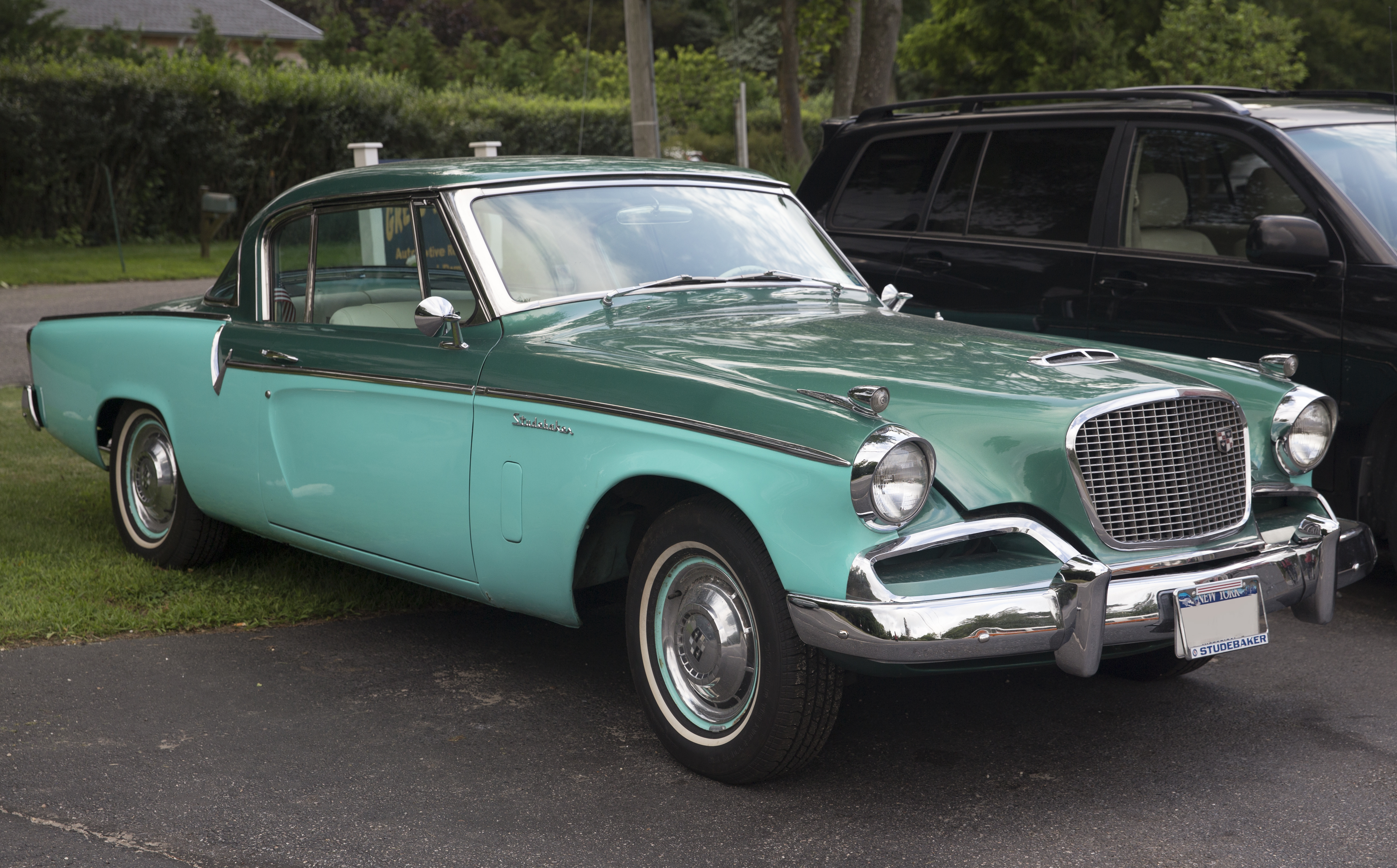

Overview
- Manufacturer: Studebaker
- Model years: 1956
- Assembly: South Bend, Indiana, United States
- Designer: Raymond Loewy

Body and chassis
- Body style: 2-door hardtop
- Layout: Front-engine, rear-wheel-drive
- Related: Packard Hawk; Studebaker Flight Hawk; Studebaker Golden Hawk; Studebaker Gran Turismo Hawk; Studebaker Hawk; Studebaker Power Hawk; Studebaker Silver Hawk

Powertrain
- Engine: 289 cu in (4.7 L) V8
- Transmission: 3-speed manual; 3-speed Flightomatic automatic

Dimensions
- Wheelbase: 120.5 in (3,061 mm)
- Curb weight: 3,215 lb (1,458 kg)

The Studebaker Sky Hawk was a pillarless two-door hardtop coupe produced by the Studebaker-Packard Corporation for the 1956 model year only. The Sky Hawk was considered part of the Studebaker President series. One of four models of Hawks available that year, the Sky Hawk was positioned between the flagship Golden Hawk and Power Hawk pillared coupe. Sky Hawks differed from Golden Hawks in that they had less chrome trim and lacked the Golden Hawk's fins. They also had slightly less luxurious interiors, and were powered by the President's 289 cubic inch (4.7 L) V-8 with 210 horsepower (157 kW) standard and 225 horsepower (168 kW) optional (rather than the Packard 352 of the Golden Hawk). The Sky Hawk's base price was $2,477 before options, and 3,050 were produced that year. The Sky Hawk was discontinued for the 1957 model year.
