= Packard Hawk =

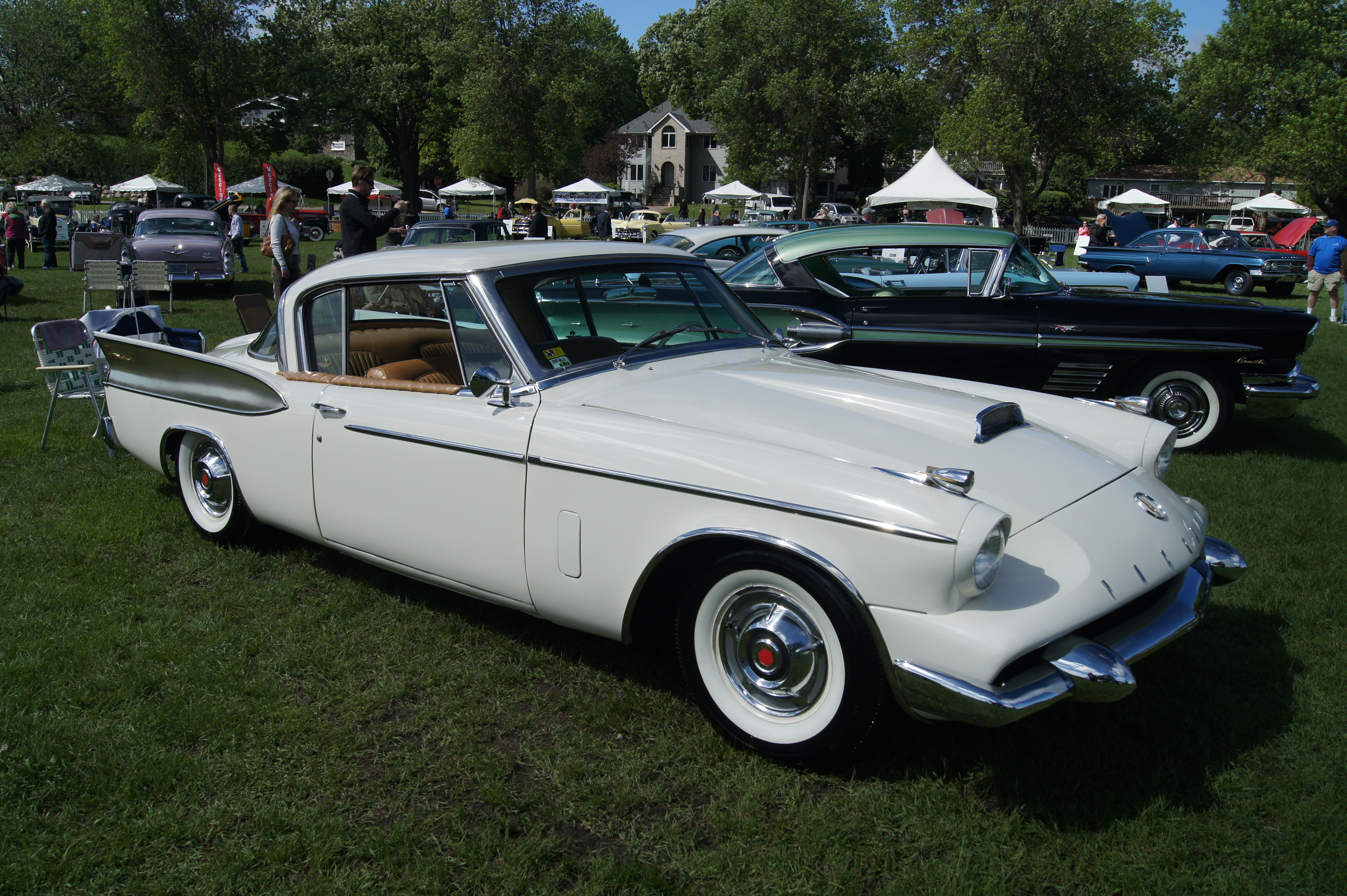

Overview
- Manufacturer: Packard (Studebaker-Packard)
- Model years: 1958
- Assembly: Studebaker Automotive Plant, South Bend, Indiana, United States

Body and chassis
- Body style: 2-door hardtop personal luxury car
- Layout: Front-engine, rear-wheel-drive
- Related: Studebaker Flight Hawk; Studebaker Golden Hawk; Studebaker Gran Turismo Hawk; Studebaker Hawk; Studebaker Power Hawk; Studebaker Silver Hawk; Studebaker Sky Hawk

Powertrain
- Engine: 289 cu in (4.7 L) V8
- Transmission: 3-speed Flightomatic automatic

Dimensions
- Wheelbase: 120.5 in (3,061 mm)
- Length: 205.2 in (5,212 mm)
- Width: 71.3 in (1,811 mm)
- Height: 54.6 in (1,387 mm)
- Curb weight: 3,470 lb (1,574 kg)

The Packard Hawk is a model of automobile. It was the sportiest of the four Packard-badged Studebakers produced in 1958, the final year of Packard production.

== History and description ==
The Packard Plant in Detroit, Michigan had been leased to Curtiss-Wright (and would be soon sold to them), and Packard models in this dying-gasp year were all rebadged and retrimmed Studebaker products. The 1958 Packard Hawk was essentially a Studebaker Golden Hawk 400 with a fiberglass front end and modified deck lid. It was positioned as an alternative to the market favorite Ford Thunderbird, which offered an all-new version in 1958 as well.

Instead of the Studebaker Hawk's upright Mercedes-style grille, the Packard Hawk had a wide, low opening just above the front bumper and covering the whole width of the car. Above this, a smoothly sloping nose, and hood—reminiscent of the 1953 Studebakers, but with a bulge as on the Golden Hawk—accommodating the engine's McCulloch supercharger that gave the Studebaker 289 in^{3} (4.7 L) V8 a total of 275 bhp (205 kW). At the rear, the sides of the fins were coated in metallized PET film, giving them a shiny metallic gold appearance. A fake spare-tire bulge adorned the 1953-style Studebaker deck lid. PACKARD appeared across the nose, with a gold Packard emblem in script—along with a Hawk badge—on the trunk lid and fins.

The interior was full leather, with full instrumentation in an engine-turned dash. As on early aircraft and custom boats, padded armrests were mounted outside the windows, a rare touch.

The styling was definitely controversial, often described as 'vacuum-cleaner' or 'catfish' by detractors. The styling has come to be appreciated more today than in its debut. Only 588 were sold, with Packard's impending demise a likely contributing factor. Most were equipped with the Borg-Warner three-speed automatic transmission. Approximately 28 were produced with the B-W T85 3-speed w/overdrive manual transmission. Studebaker-Packard was the first manufacturer to popularize the limited-slip differential, which they termed Twin-Traction. Most Packard Hawks came with TT. It was certainly the fastest Packard ever sold, since it shared the majority of its components with Studebaker's Golden Hawk. The price was $3995, about $700 higher than the Studebaker model, but with a more luxurious interior. Electric window-lifts and power seats were optional extras.

The 'Packardbaker' final-year cars that are low-production vehicle that generally sells for higher prices than the similar Studebaker models, although the market value is still low by comparison with Corvettes and Thunderbirds. Because a Studebaker drivetrain was used, mechanical parts are more readily available, although body and trim parts are difficult to find. Current restoration costs almost always exceed the selling price.

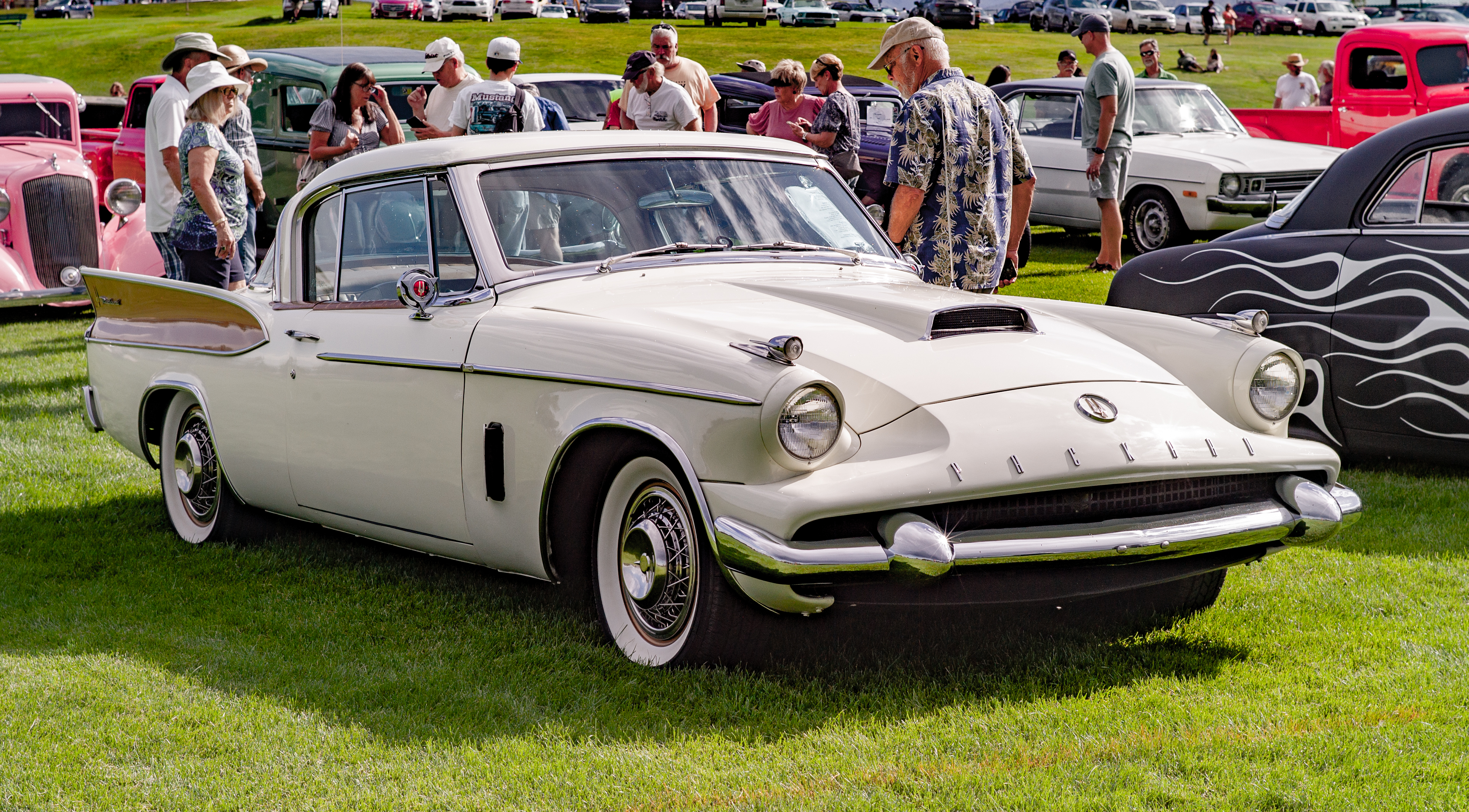
1958 Packard Hawk

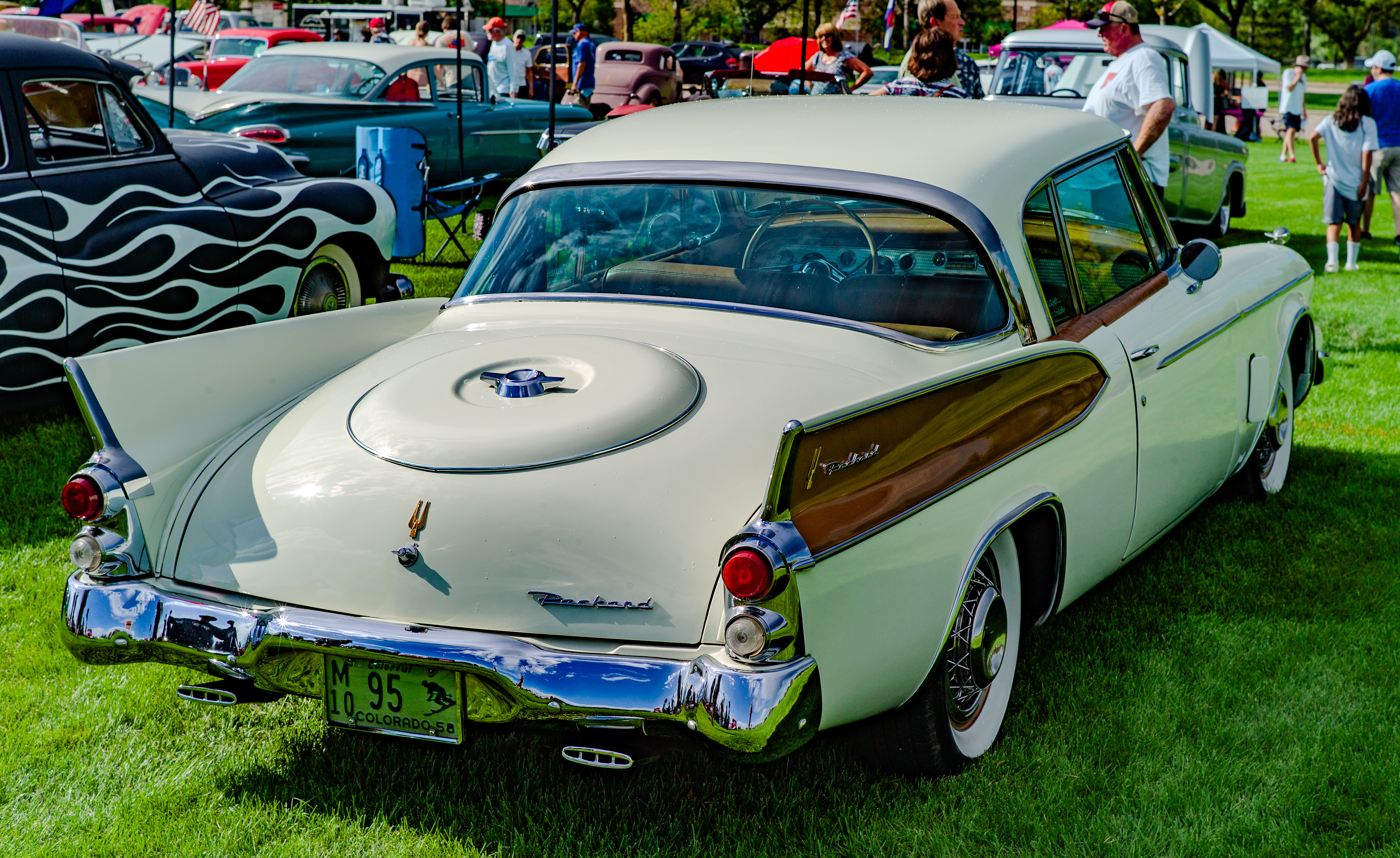
Rear view of 1958 Hawk

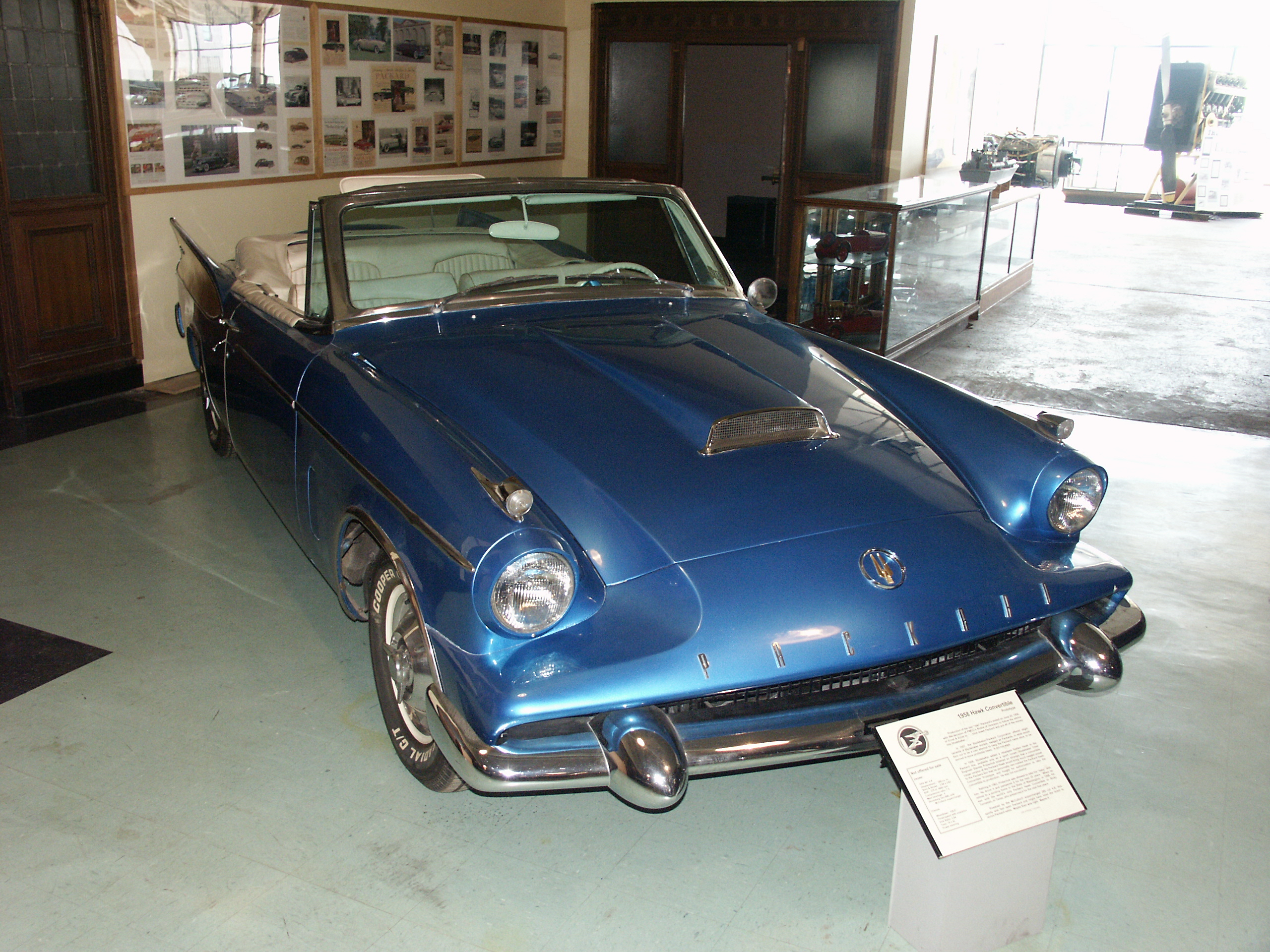
1958 Packard Hawk convertible prototype

== Specifications ==
Engine

- Type: Cast iron 90° V8, Silv-O-Lite dish-type pistons
- Displacement: 289 cubic inches
- Bore X stroke: 3.56 X 3.63 inches
- Compression ratio: 7.5:1
- Power at rpm: 275 hp (205 kW) at 4,800 rpm
- Torque at rpm: 333 lb⋅ft (451 N⋅m) at 3,200 rpm
- Valvetrain: Overhead valves, solid lifters
- Main bearings: 5
- Ignition: Delco-Remy breaker-point
- Fuel system: 2-bbl Stromberg 380475 downdraft carburetor, McCulloch supercharger, 5 psi (34 kPa) max
- Lubrication system: Full-pressure, gear-driven
- Electrical system: 12-volt, 30 amperes
- Exhaust system: Cast iron manifolds, dual exhaust

Transmission

- Type: Borg-Warner Flightomatic automatic
- Ratios
  - 1st: 2.40:1
  - 2nd: 1.47:1
  - 3rd: 1.0:1
  - Reverse: 2.0:1

Differential

- Type: Semi-floating hypoid, Twin-Traction Spicer-Thornton limited-slip
- Ratio: 3.31:1

Steering

- Type: Power assist, Saginaw recirculating ball
- Ratio: 19.2:1
- Turns, lock-to-lock: 4.5
- Turning circle: 41 ft (12 m)

Brakes

- Type: Four wheel, power-assist Wagner hydraulic
- Front: Cast-iron finned drum, 11 X 2.5 in
- Rear: Cast-iron drum, 10 X 2 in
- Swept area: 172.8 sq in

Chassis & Body

- Construction: All-steel, box section, double-drop side rails, 5 crossmembers
- Body style: Two-door, five-passenger hardtop, soft top prototype
- Layout: Front engine, rear-wheel drive

Suspension

- Front: Individual unequal-length upper and lower control arms, coil springs, hydraulic shocks, anti-sway bar
- Rear: Live axle, semi-elliptic leaf springs, hydraulic shocks

Wheels & Tires

- Wheels: Kelsey-Hays tubeless 5-lug stamped steel
- Front/rear: 5.5 X 14 in
- Tires: Bias-ply
- Front/rear: 8.00 X 14 in

Weights & Measures

- Wheelbase: 120.5 in (306 cm)
- Overall length: 205.2 in (521 cm)
- Overall width: 71.3 in (181 cm)
- Overall height: 54.6 in (139 cm)
- Front track: 56.7 in (144 cm)
- Rear track: 55.7 in (141 cm)
- Shipping weight: 3,470 lb (1,570 kg)

Capacities

- Crankcase: 5 US qt (4.7 L)
- Cooling system: 17 US qt (16 L)
- Fuel tank: 18 US gal (68 L)
- Transmission: 19 US pt (9.0 L)

Calculated Data

- Bhp per c.i.d.: 0.95
- Weight per bhp: 12.62 lb (5.72 kg)

Performance

- 0–60 mph (97 km/h): 12.0 seconds
- ¼ mile ET: 16.7 seconds at 82.3 mph (132.4 km/h)
- Top speed: 125 mph (201 km/h)
- Fuel mileage: 12 mpg city, 20 mpg highway

Production

- 1958 Packard Hawk: 588

== Sources ==
- Kimes, Beverly Rae, ed. (1978). Packard, a history of the motor car and the company (General ed.). Automobile Quarterly. ISBN 0-915038-11-0.
- Dawes, Nathaniel D. (1975). The Packard: 1942–1962. Cranbury, New Jersey: A.S. Barnes & Co. Inc. ISBN 0-498-01353-7.
- Patrick, Mark A., ed. (1996). Packard Motor Cars 1946-1958 Photo Archive. Osceola, Wisconsin: Iconographix. ISBN 1-882256-45-X.
- Clarke, R. M. (September 1988). Packard Gold Portfolio 1946–1958. Motorbooks International. ISBN 1-870642-19-8.
- Editors of Consumer’s Guide (1993). "Packard Hawk". Encyclopedia of American Cars from 1930. Publications International. ISBN 0-7853-0175-5.
- Burness, Tad (1978). American Car Spotter's Guide, 1940–65. Motorbooks International. ISBN 0-87938-057-8.
