= PowerHawk =

PowerHawk or Power Hawk may refer to:

- Six Chuter Power Hawk, an American powered parachute design
- Sky Science PowerHawk, a British powered parachute design
- Studebaker Power Hawk, an American automobile design
