= Studebaker Power Hawk =

1956 car model

The Studebaker Power Hawk is a two-door pillared coupe manufactured by the Studebaker-Packard Corporation for the 1956 model year only. The Power Hawk was technically part of the Studebaker Commander series, and featured the Commander's 259 cubic inch (4.2 L) V-8, which generated 170 horsepower (127 kW) with two-barrel carburetor or 185 hp (138 kW) with an optional four-barrel carb and dual exhaust. The Power Hawk was positioned between the base Flight Hawk pillared coupe and the Sky Hawk pillarless hardtop coupe. The car cost $2,101 before options and weighed 3,095 pounds (1404 kg). Both the Power Hawk and Flight Hawk were dropped at the end of the 1956 model year and replaced with the Studebaker Silver Hawk beginning in 1957. 7,095 were produced in the one year of production.

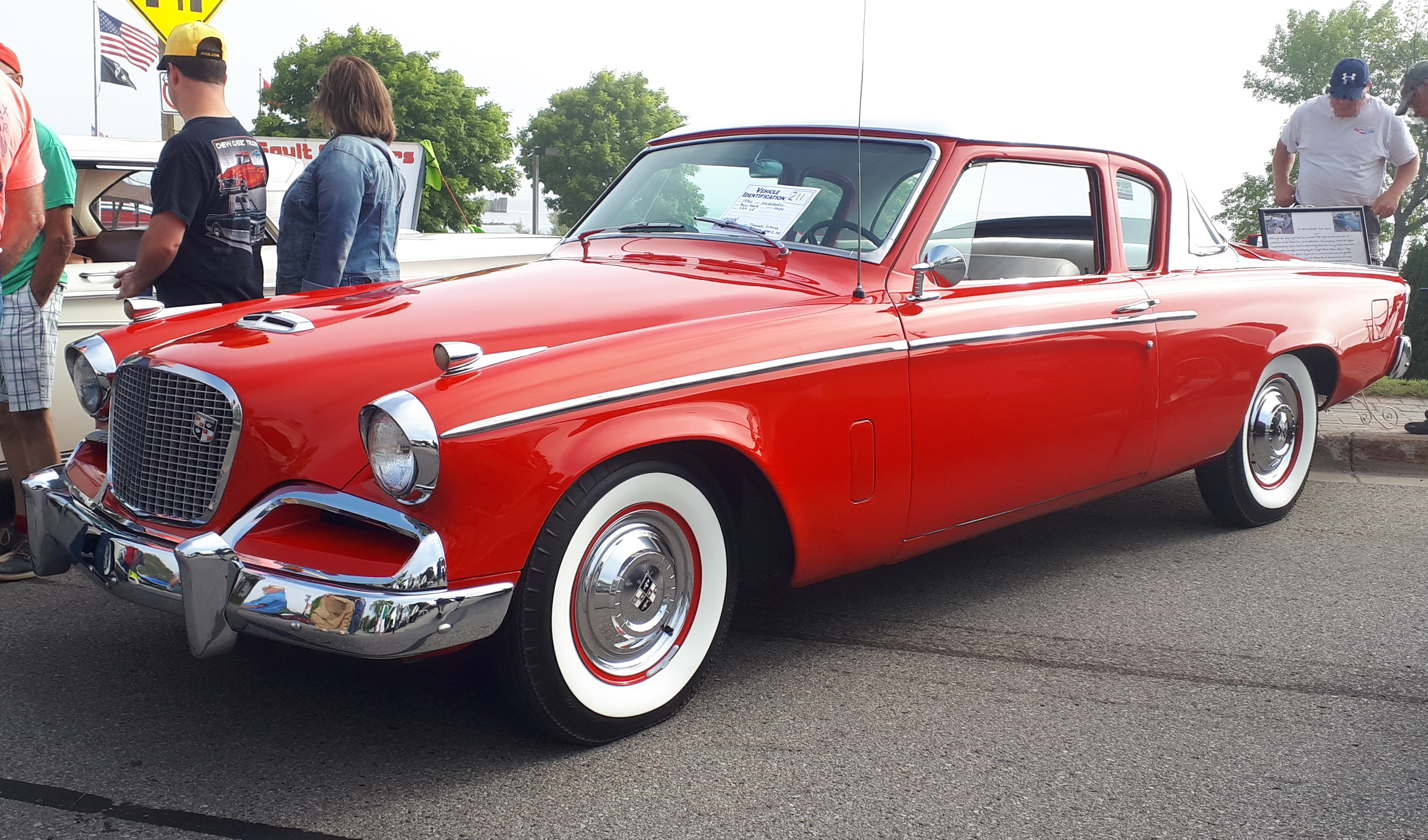
1956 Studebaker Power Hawk

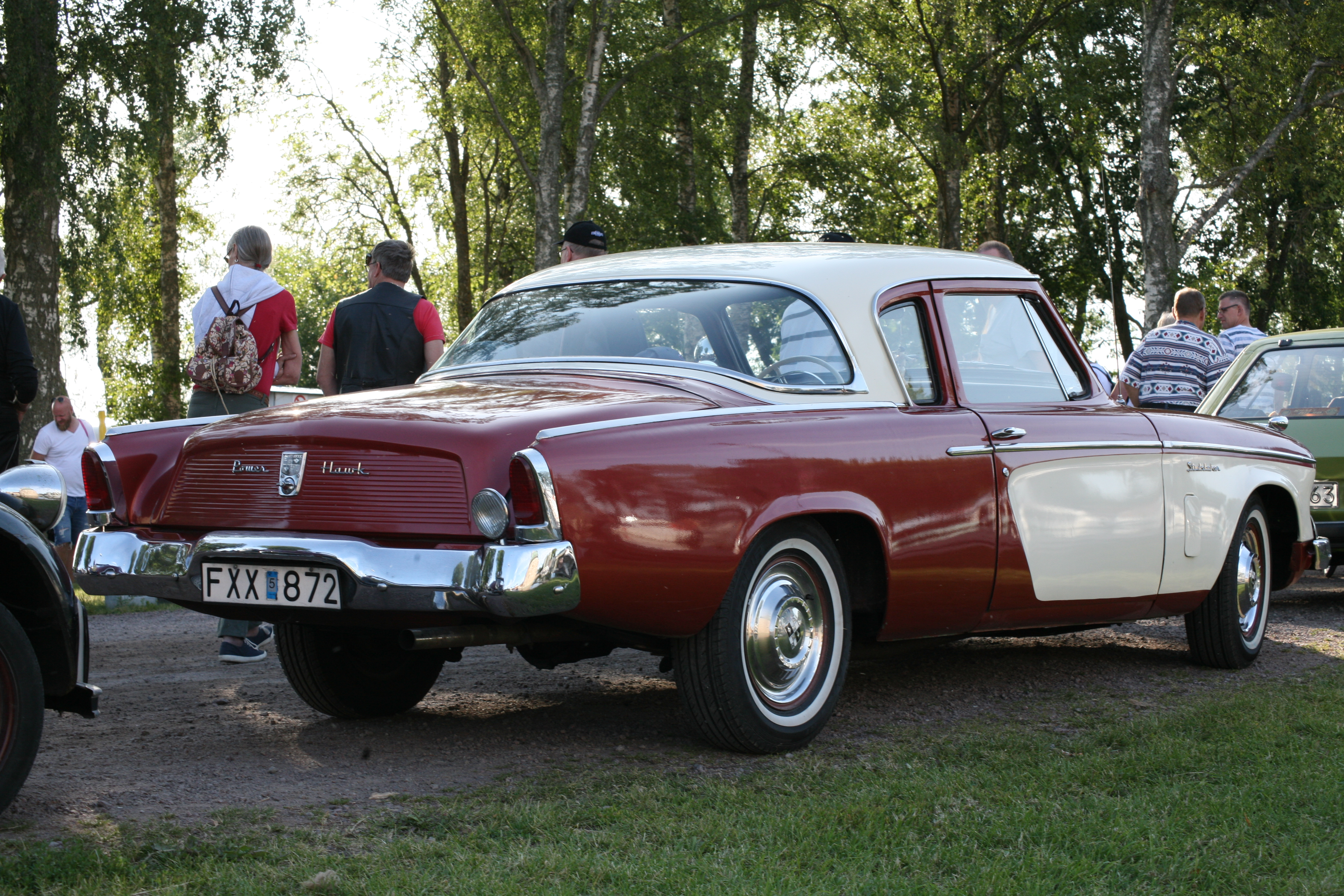
1956 Studebaker Power Hawk rear
