= Studebaker Gran Turismo Hawk =

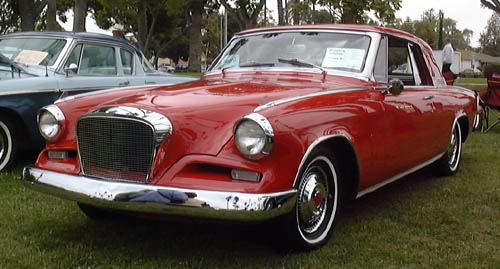
- 1962

Overview
- Manufacturer: Studebaker
- Production: 1962–December 1963 (1962–1964 model years)
- Assembly: Studebaker Automotive Plant, South Bend, Indiana, United States; Studebaker Canada, Hamilton, Ontario, Canada; Studebaker Australia, Melbourne, Victoria, Australia
- Designer: Brooks Stevens

Body and chassis
- Body style: 2-door coupe
- Layout: FR layout
- Related: Excalibur roadster

Chronology
- Successor: Studebaker Avanti

The Studebaker Gran Turismo Hawk (or GT Hawk) was a grand touring coupe sold by Studebaker motors between 1962 and 1964. The top of the Studebaker line, it was the final development of the Hawk series that began with the Golden Hawk in 1956.

== 1962 ==
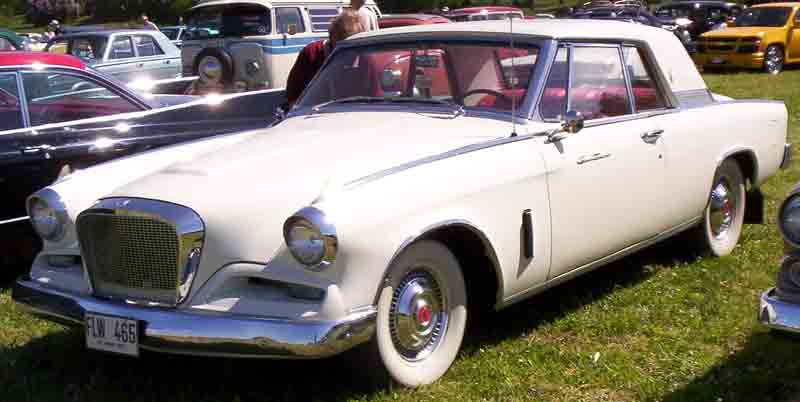
The 1962 had rectangular blinkers

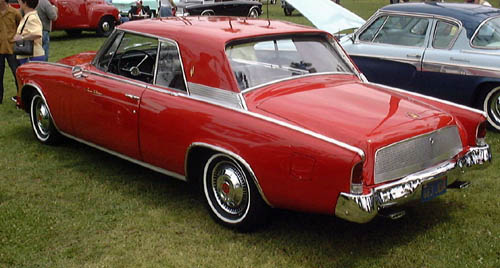
A brushed aluminum panel covered part of the trunk

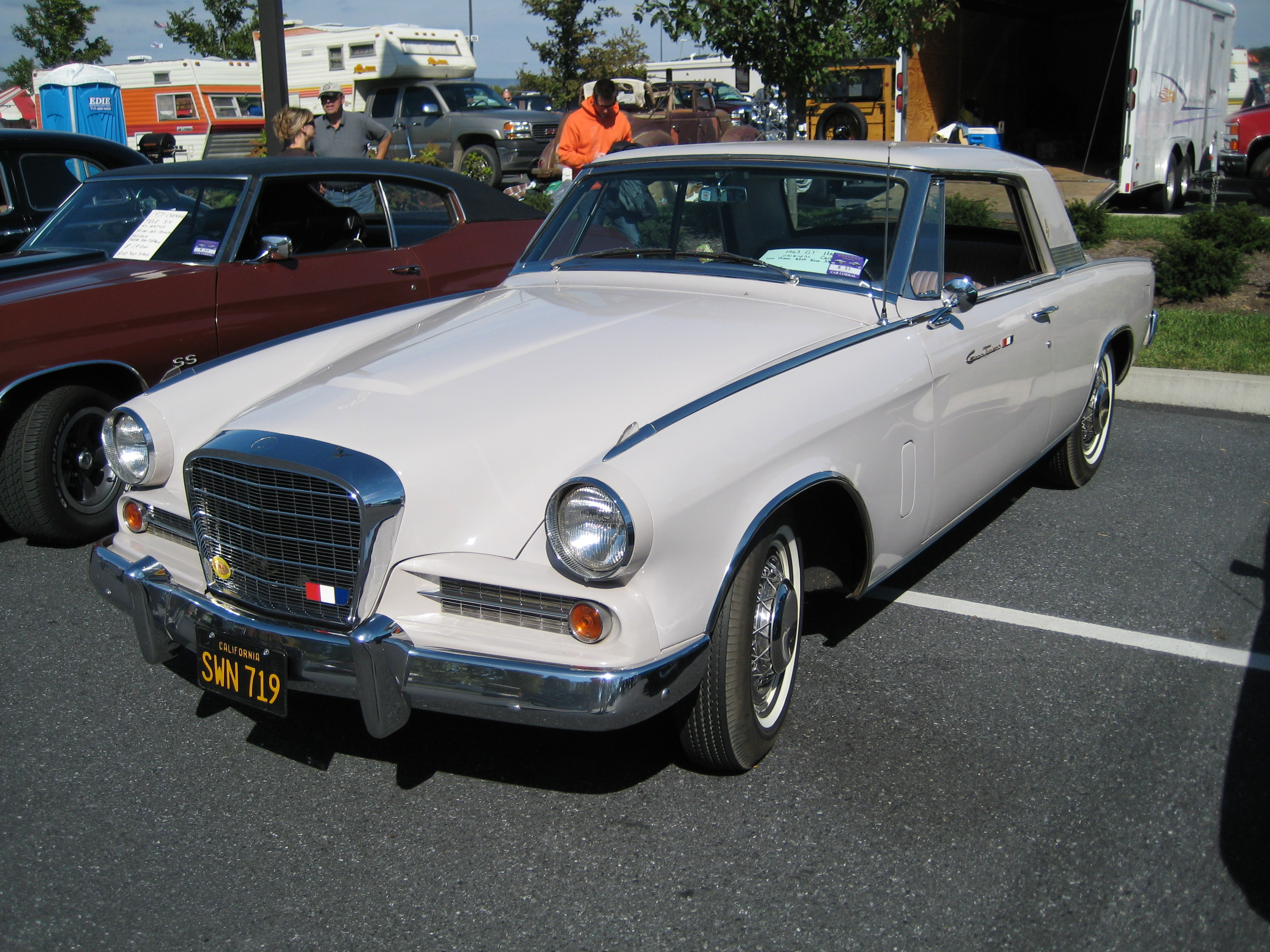
The blinkers became round in 1963

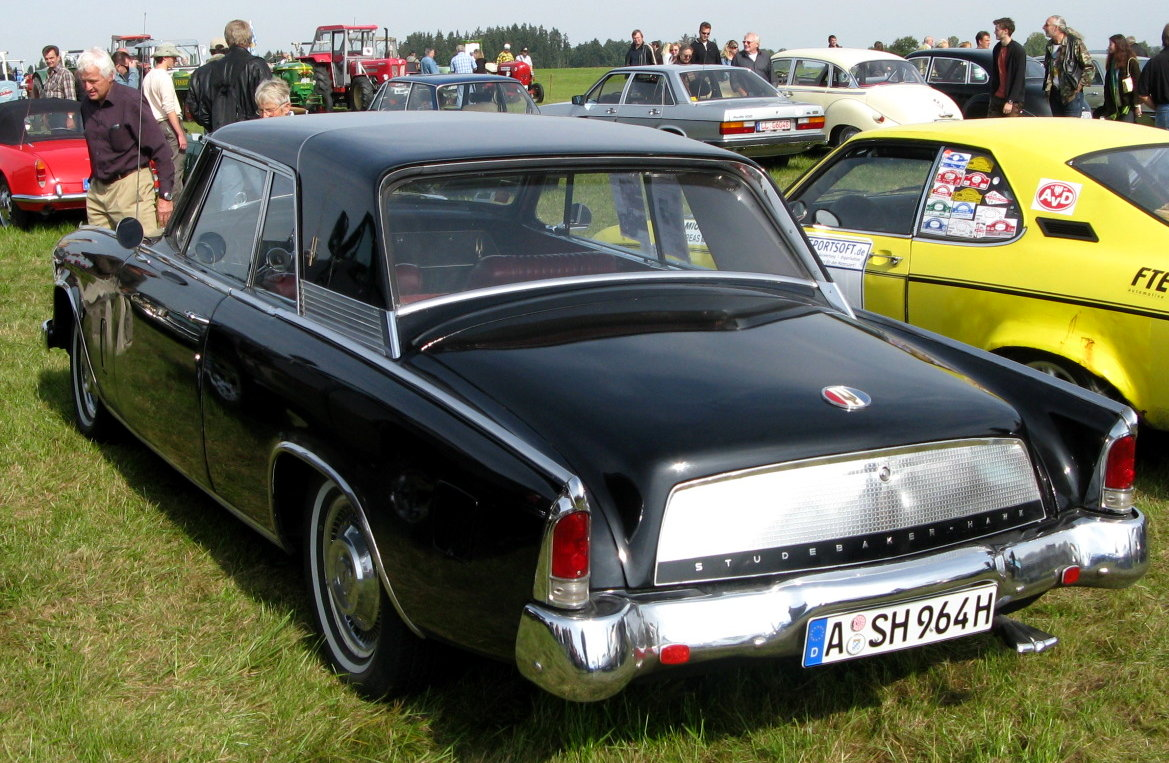
"Studebaker Hawk" was added to the aluminum trunk panel in 1963

=== Redesigning the Hawk ===
The GT Hawk's styling was a fairly radical facelift by designer Brooks Stevens of the older Hawk shape; Stevens went after a European-inspired, clean look for the car he codenamed the "Hawk Monaco" (his prototype even had Monegasque license plates). The hood from the older Hawk was retained, but was given a more pronounced (imitation) radiator frame to more closely resemble the cars of Mercedes-Benz, which at the time were distributed by Studebaker. The grille inside the radiator frame was patterned after the Mercedes as well.

Despite the European influence, the Gran Turismo Hawk drew on American influences, too; the roofline was heavily inspired by the Ford Thunderbird and was styled with similarly thick B-pillars. A chrome edge running from front to rear highlighted the top of the bodywork in very similar fashion to that on the contemporary Lincoln Continental. The taillights were particularly fashioned after the Lincoln's, and the trunk lid was given a faux brightwork "grille" overlay (to hide the grooves of the otherwise carryover 1956–61 lid) that resembled the Lincoln as well.

Stevens's extensive yet inexpensive modifications to the body finally rid the car of the 1950s-style tailfins and bodyside trim of previous models. The rear window was nearly flat and recessed, reducing the cost of an ordinarily expensive piece of glass. Overall, the exterior look kept the smooth, aerodynamic style of previous Studebakers but moved up to date.

=== Passenger compartment updates ===
Stevens also cleaned up the interior with a modern instrument panel that could be ordered with a full complement of large, easy-to-read gauges within close range of the driver's line of sight. The top of the panel was also padded for safety. This dashboard would prove to be another Studebaker trendsetter; later Chrysler models in particular (such as the 1977–1989 Dodge Diplomat) would have instrument arrangements clearly inspired by the Hawk.

The GT featured bucket seats and a console in the front, befitting a grand-touring car, and all seats were upholstered in either cloth and vinyl or all-pleated vinyl.

Unfortunately, the pleated vinyl (which was the overwhelming preference of buyers) was of poor quality during the 1962 production run and deteriorated rapidly. The problem was solved with the change to US Royal Naugahyde vinyl in 1963, but with sales already faltering, the reputation of the shoddy 1962 upholstery didn't help matters.

== Chassis and engineering ==
Because of Studebaker's poor financial shape, the underpinnings of the car remained very similar to previous Hawks. For that matter, there wasn't much difference, chassis-wise, between a 1962 Hawk and a 1953 Starliner/Starlight. This thriftiness has turned out to be a boon for owners of today, as Studebaker's limited use of custom-engineered parts has translated into wide availability of replacement parts 50+ years after the firm's demise.

For 1962, a Hawk buyer could choose from either two- or four-barrel carbureted versions of Studebaker's 289-cubic-inch (4.7 L) V8 engine (210 or 225 horsepower) teamed with standard three-speed manual, overdrive four-speed or Flight-O-Matic automatic transmission. The stock engine was low compression (8.5:1) which lowered its power output while providing longer engine life.

Beginning with the 1963 model year, the "Jet Thrust" R-series V-8 engines designed for the Avanti could be ordered throughout the Studebaker line, with the naturally aspirated R1 delivering 240 bhp (180 kW), the supercharged R2 giving 289 bhp (216 kW) and the limited-production supercharged 304.5 in³ (5.0 L) R3 powerplant issuing forth a full 335 bhp (250 kW). Handling and braking improvements were made to match the high-performance engines, with front and rear anti-roll bars, rear radius rods, heavy-duty springs, and front disc brakes all available ala carte or in a "Super Hawk" package (introduced mid year) with an R1 or R2 engine. Avanti engines that were factory installed in Hawks (and Larks) had serial numbers beginning with "JT" (for R1) and "JTS" (for R2), rather than the "R" and "RS" prefixes used in Avantis.

At over 3,000 pounds the Gran Turismo was a sound performer with any of these engines; the stock 289 could get up to 18 mpg on the highway. The blown R-engines offered considerable power, with the 304 delivering well over one hp per cu in, putting it well into Corvette territory for the era. Despite the fact that Studebaker's V8 was a heavy engine for its size, the Hawk was, with the Super Hawk package, a car with surprisingly good handling for a contemporary American car.

== Annual styling refinements ==
=== 1963 ===
For 1963 the car was slightly restyled, with refinements to the front, sides, and rear. Round parking lights below the headlights replaced the previous rectangular ones, set into the corners of the newly closed side grilles that bore a squared pattern of lines over fine mesh. This same squared mesh pattern was carried over onto the main grille, replacing the simple fine mesh of the 1962 models. Early in 1963 production the parking light bezels were changed and the right side of the dash became woodgrain, matching the area around the instruments. The doors had red, white, and blue emblems added next to the Gran Turismo emblems, and at the rear, the aluminum overlay's colors were reversed and red, white, and blue were added to the Hawk emblem on the top of the trunk lid. Inside, 1963 Hawks have vertical pleats in the seat upholstery, replacing the 1962's horizontal pleats, and have far superior vinyl.

=== 1964 ===
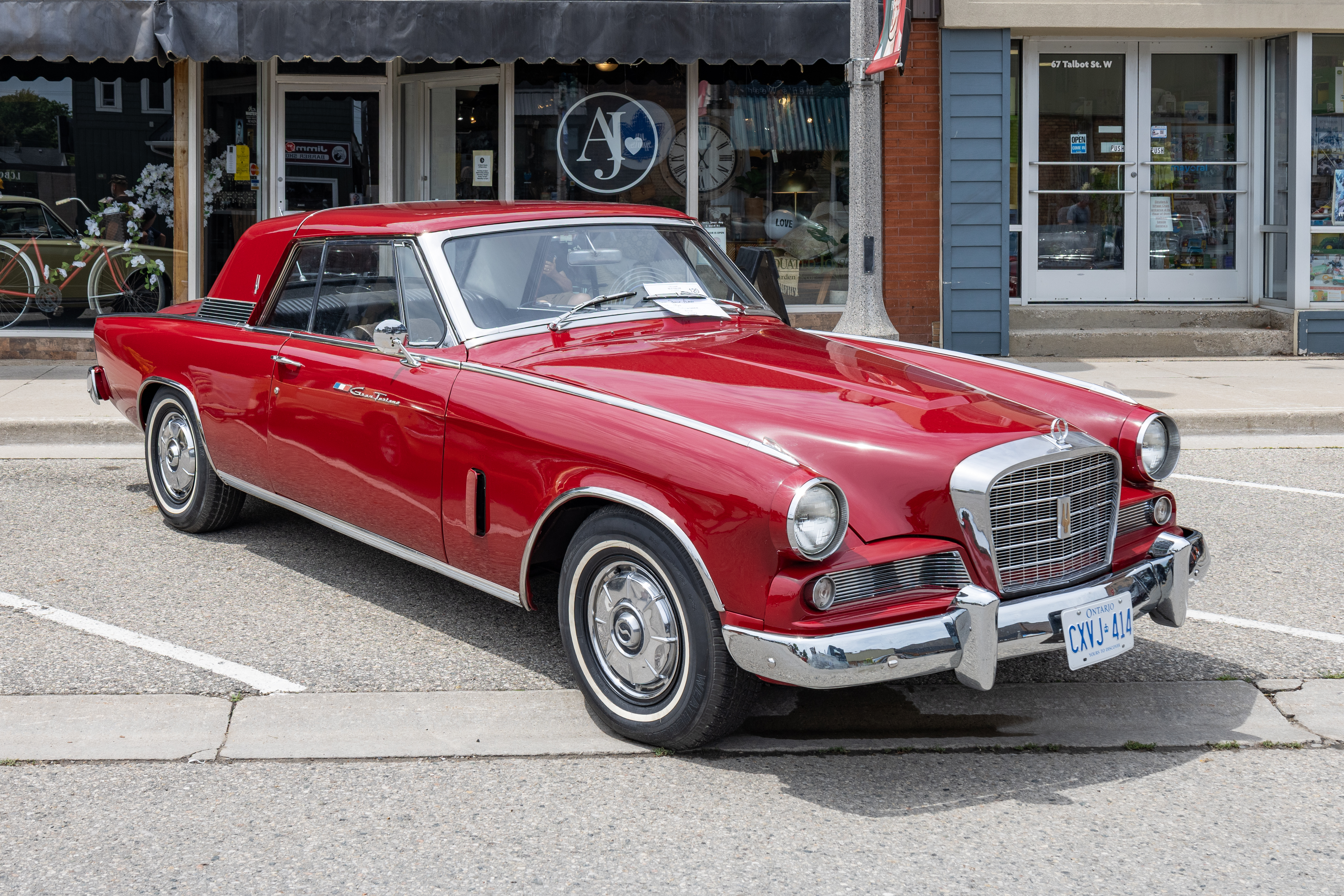
A Hawk emblem distinguished the grille of the 1964 model.

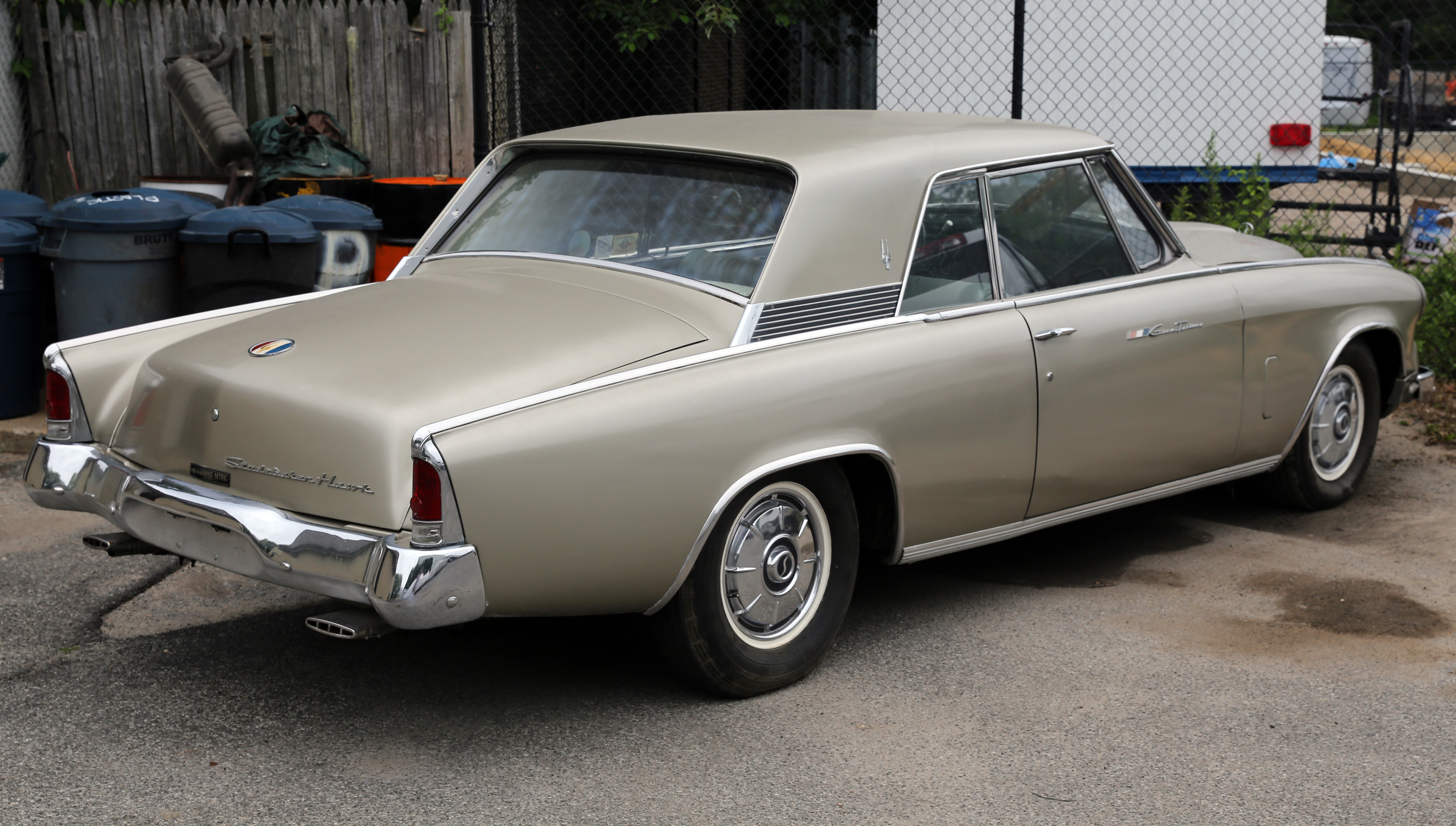
The trunk's brushed aluminum panel was eliminated in 1964

For the 1964 model year, the GT saw some extensive design changes. Tooling money was finally appropriated to eliminate the grooved trunk lid that had required the 1962–63 Hawks' faux rear "grille." The new, smooth trunklid bore a script "Studebaker Hawk" nameplate. Another grille change was made, this time with two new features: A Hawk emblem was centered in the grille, and a circle-S hood ornament (shared with the regular '64 Studebaker passenger cars) graced the top of the grille shell.

Perhaps the most interesting and notable exterior change involved the top of the car. Stevens, who had envisioned a half-vinyl-covered roof as part of the original Gran Turismo design, finally got his way with the '64 model. The new "Sport Roof" was made available in two colors (white or black) at a cost of $65.

New wheelcovers, shared with the rest of Studebaker's 1964 passenger-car line, were also added, along with painted dots on the headliner vinyl (replacing holes used in 1962–63), new silver-threaded cloth upholstery, larger upper-instrument-panel pad and a new lower-instrument-panel pad, and horizontal pleats on the side upholstery panels (replacing vertical ones). And, for the first time, Hawk buyers could order an AM-FM radio as a factory-installed option.

When Studebaker closed its South Bend, Indiana plant in December 1963, the GT Hawk was among the models discontinued by the company, which consolidated all production in Hamilton, Ontario, Canada, where manufacture of the Lark lasted only two more years, using Chevrolet-based engines.

== Motor sport ==
Andy Granatelli, then president of Studebaker's Paxton Products Division, took two 1964-model Gran Turismo Hawks to the Bonneville Salt Flats in September and October 1963. Both cars, which left the South Bend factory with regular-production 289 V8 engines, were retrofitted with R-series high-performance 304.5 cu. in. V8s that were built for Studebaker by Paxton.

At Bonneville during the September session, the R3-powered car (which was supercharged), designated #5, ran the flying kilometer at a speed of 157.29 mph (253.13 km/h). The R4-powered car (naturally aspirated, but with dual four-barrel carburetors), car #4, set a fastest average speed of 147.86 mph (237.96 km/h).

When Granatelli and company returned to the flats in October, the R3 car was driven to a top speed of 154 mph (248 km/h), while the R4 car made several runs at more than 135 mph (217 km/h).

The Hawks were among several Studebakers that were run at Bonneville during this time period. The company's cars set 72 USAC records in September, and raised that to 337 the following month. Most of the records were set by the company's Lark-based Daytona convertibles, but the Hawks made a more than credible showing.

Impressed by this display of performance, Indianapolis, Indiana's Dick Passwater, a USAC and NASCAR Grand National driver in the 1950s and 1960s, purchased the R3-powered car from Granatelli following the Bonneville runs. Passwater convinced Studebaker to sponsor him, and he entered the car in the 1964 Yankee 300, as well as some other races, including some on dirt tracks. The car's best showing came in the Yankee 300, when Passwater finished tenth despite having brake problems with the car that forced him out of the race.

== Sales ==
Despite Studebaker's efforts to revitalize the Hawk, sales were slow, as indicated by the figures shown below. Sales figures for two of the GT Hawk's primary competitors, the Ford Thunderbird and the Pontiac Grand Prix, are included for comparison purposes:

Year	GT Hawk Sales	GT Hawk Export Sales	Thunderbird Sales	Grand Prix Sales
1962	8,388	947	78,011	30,195
1963	4,009	625	63,313	72,959
1964*	1,484	283	92,465	63,810

* Studebaker ceased production at its South Bend factory, including all GT Hawk production, on 20 December 1963. Figures shown for the 1964 Thunderbird and Grand Prix are for the entire 1964 model year.

Studebaker considered the GT Hawk very much a European-style GT, and accordingly the car was sold in Europe and elsewhere, though not in great numbers. Models shipped to Great Britain and Australia were equipped with right-hand-drive. 1962 and 1963 models were also assembled in Australia.

== See also ==
- Golden Hawk, Silver Hawk – predecessor Studebakers
