= Studebaker Flight Hawk =

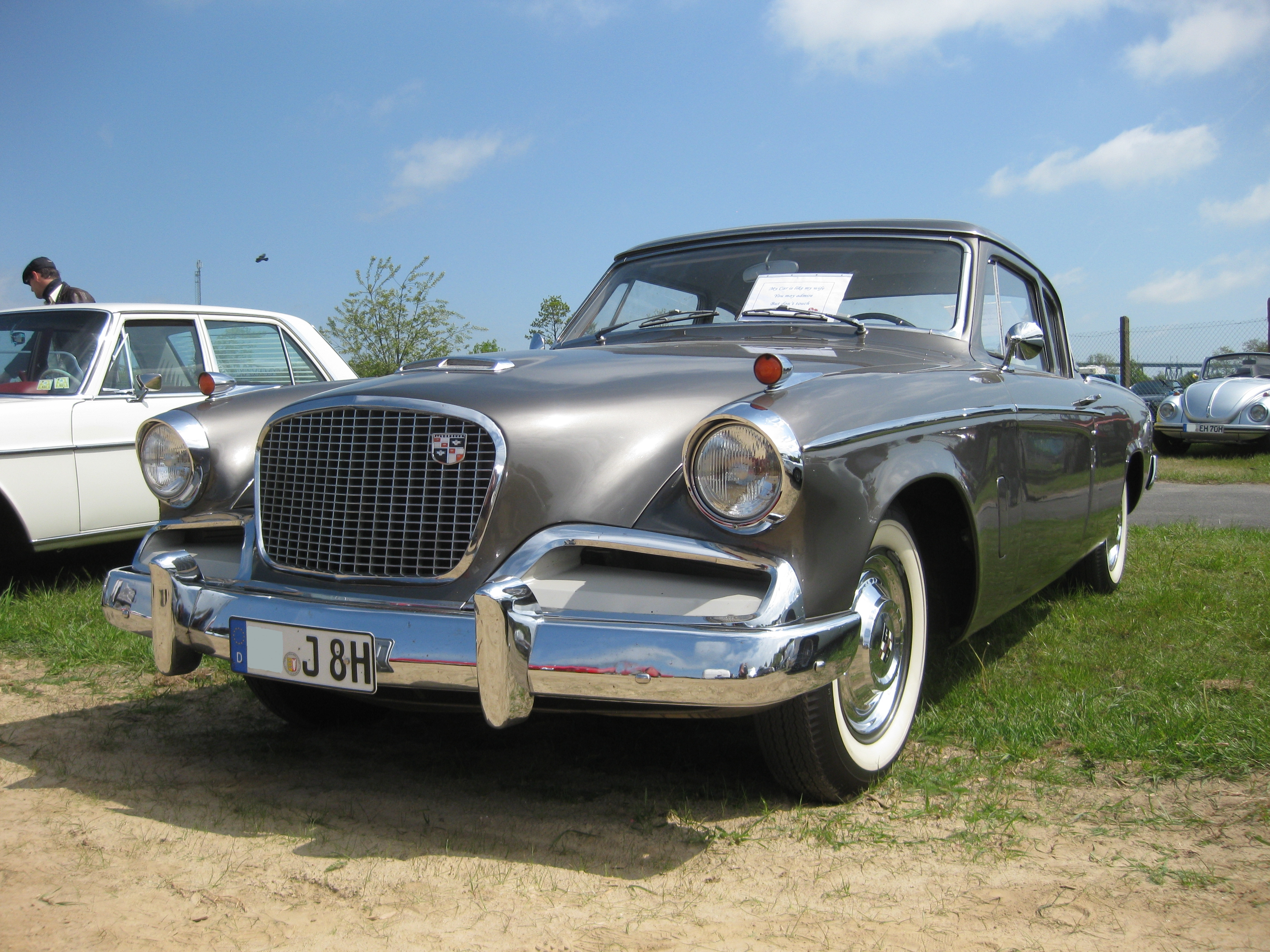

Overview
- Manufacturer: Studebaker
- Production: 1956
- Designer: Raymond Loewy

Body and chassis
- Body style: Coupe
- Layout: Front-engine, rear-wheel-drive
- Related: Studebaker Champion

Powertrain
- Engine: 185.6 cu in (3.0 L)
- Transmission: 3-speed manual; 3-speed with overdrive; 3-speed automatic

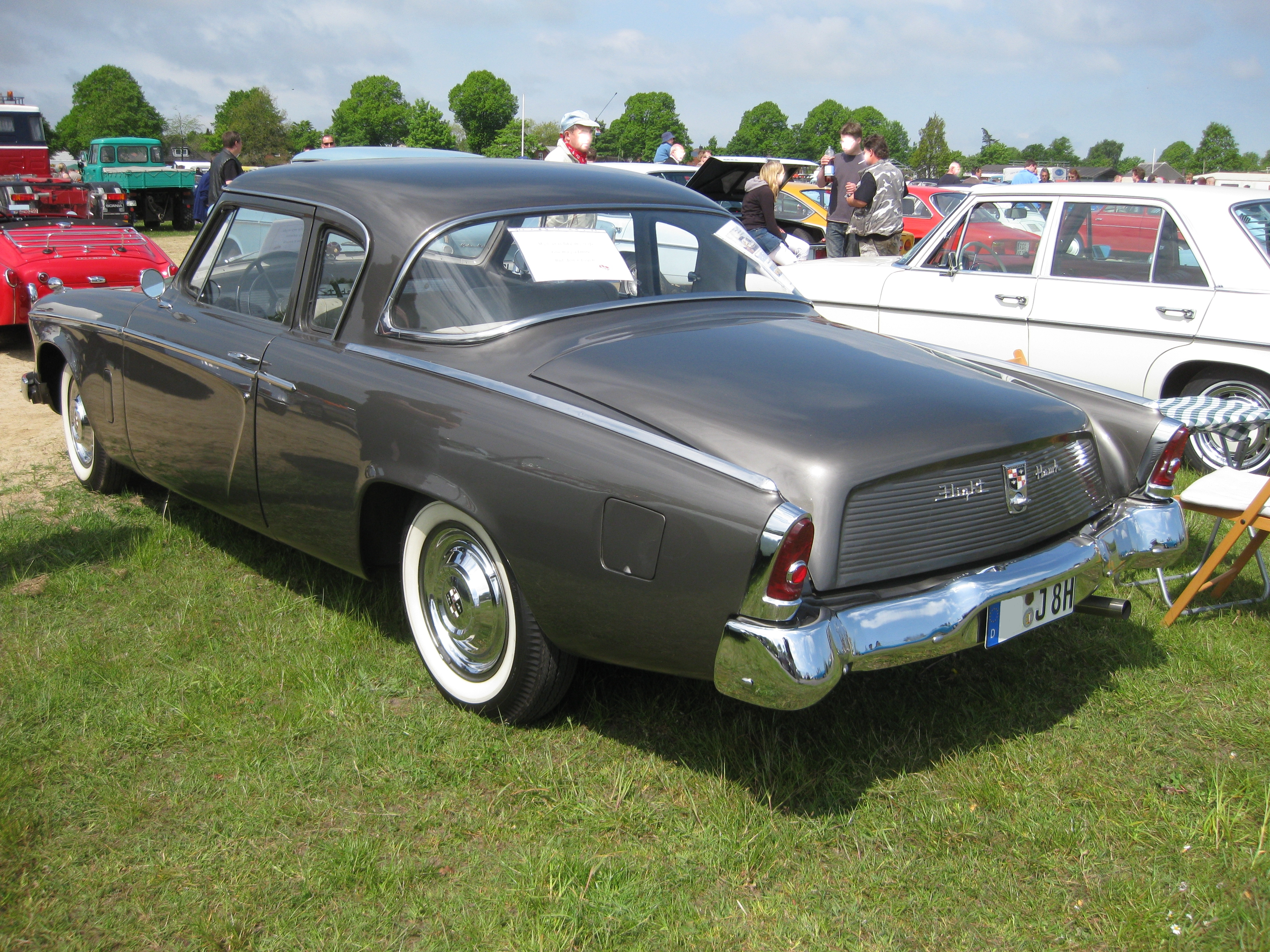
Studebaker Flight Hawk

The Studebaker Flight Hawk produced by Studebaker in 1956 was the lowest-priced model in the four-model Hawk family sports car line that included the Golden Hawk, Sky Hawk, Power Hawk, and Flight Hawk.

== Styling ==
The Flight Hawk was a product of a Raymond Loewy design. It was based on the Champion two-door coupe that was introduced for the 1953 model year. Like the other 1956 Hawks, the Flight Hawk received a new hood, grille, deck lid, and instrument panel. Flight Hawks otherwise had the minimum amount of exterior chrome. Things like oil filter, backup lamps, radio, clock, windshield washers, outside mirrors, heater, and full hubcaps were available from the factory or could be added through the dealer.

== Power ==
While the other Hawk models were powered by V8 engines, the Flight Hawk came with the Champion's 185.6 cu in (3.0 L) inline six-cylinder engine, rated at 101 hp (75 kW; 102 PS). Standard was a three-speed manual transmission, an optional overdrive unit, or a three-speed automatic transmission (known as Flight-O-Matic).

== Available models ==
The Flight Hawk was a two-door pillared coupe (model 56G-C3), which carried a list price of $1,986. There were 560 Flight Hawk Hardtops, model 56G-K7, built for export (499 sold), Canadian use (52 sold), and special order (9 sold in the US). This brought the total 1956 Flight Hawk production to 4,949.

== Production ==
- Coupe, Model 56G-C3, 4,389 total, broken down by manufacturing plant:
  - 2,508 (South Bend plant)
  - 557 (Los Angeles plant)
  - 584 (Hamilton, Ont. plant)
  - 740 (Exported to other countries)
- Hardtop, Model 56G-K7, 560 total, broken down by manufacturing plant:
  - 9 (South Bend plant)
  - 52 (Hamilton, Ont. plant)
  - 499 (Exported to other countries)

Of the four available Hawks for 1956, the Golden Hawk, Sky Hawk, Power Hawk, and Flight Hawk, the Flight Hawk was the second-most popular. The Power Hawk, with 7,095 produced for all markets, was the most popular.

As of 2024, there are only 33 model 56G-C3 left in the world.

== Discontinuation ==
Studebaker simplified the Hawk line for 1957. This meant the end for the Flight, Power, and Sky Hawks, which were combined into the new Silver Hawk series.
