= Studebaker Silver Hawk =

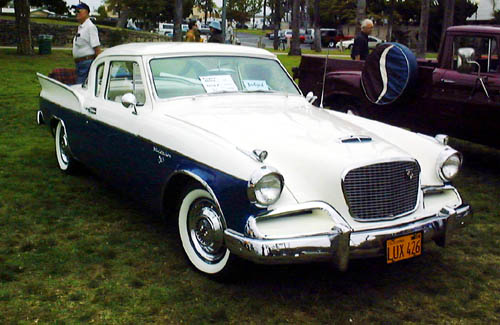
- 1957 Studebaker Silver Hawk

Overview
- Manufacturer: Studebaker
- Assembly: Studebaker Automotive Plant, South Bend, Indiana, United States; Studebaker Canada, Hamilton, Ontario, Canada; Studebaker Australia, Melbourne, Victoria, Australia

Body and chassis
- Body style: 2-door coupe
- Layout: FR layout

The Studebaker Silver Hawk is an automobile produced in 1957, 1958 and 1959 by the Studebaker Corporation of South Bend, Indiana. Studebaker introduced the "Hawk" line in 1956, with four models based on the wheelbase and body of the '53 coupes and hardtops designed by Robert Bourke, as head of the design team Studebaker contracted from Raymond Loewy Associates. In 1956 the Golden Hawk, Sky Hawk and Power Hawk came with 352 cid, 289 cid and 259 cid v-8s respectively, while the Flight Hawk ran the Champion 185 cid engine. The Golden and Sky Hawks were hardtops; while the Power and Flight Hawks were pillared coupes. Only one of the four models in 1956 sported any fins, that being the Golden Hawk.

== 1957–1958 ==
In 1957 the Silver Hawk was introduced as a pillared coupe, replacing both the Power Hawk and Flight Hawk. The 185 cid Champion engine was standard in the model, with the 259 Commander V-8 offered only in export models. The Sky Hawk was also dropped in 1957, resulting in only two Studebaker Hawk models offered that year, the Silver Hawk with Champion Six or standard 289 V-8 and the Golden Hawk with the supercharged President 289 V-8. A one-year-only model '58 Packard Hawk was also offered with the 289 supercharged engine.

In appearance, the Silver Hawk was plainer than the Golden Hawk. Besides being a coupe, while the Golden was always a hardtop, there was a bit less chrome, no supercharger or bulge in the hood, and a simpler two-tone paint scheme was adopted — simply one color below the chrome belt line and another above, but unlike the Golden Hawk, the lower color included the fin. Some dealers painted the fin only, and sometimes the deck lid recess and or the left and right "side grills" were painted in a contrasting Studebaker color. These usually matched the interior, some were Blue, Gold, Red, or Black and were better looking according to many owners than the factory two-tone paint scheme.

== 1959 ==
For 1959, the Silver Hawk became the only Hawk model in production, largely because Studebaker dealers wanted a glamorous flagship model as a dealership draw. Those customers would more than likely walk out with Studebaker's last-ditch hope, the new Lark compact. In fact, the Silver Hawk was the only non-Lark model kept. Studebakers were also exported and rebuilt as CKD's (completely Knock Down) to Belgium. Prospects could order whatever model or options (with- or without fins) to suit their preference. Cars were built by D'Ieteren Frères of Belgium for European markets such as the Netherlands where Studebaker was quite popular.

Changes for 1959 included new tailfins, with the "Silver Hawk" script moved to the fins instead of on the trunk lid (where new individual block letters spelling out STUDEBAKER were placed), with a new Hawk badge in between the two words. The parking lights moved to the side grilles from the front fenders, chrome moldings around the windows (from the 1953–1954 models) similar to the Golden Hawk were added, and the interior was somewhere in between the two former models' levels of luxury. Two-tone paint was discontinued for all U.S. orders, though it was still available for export.

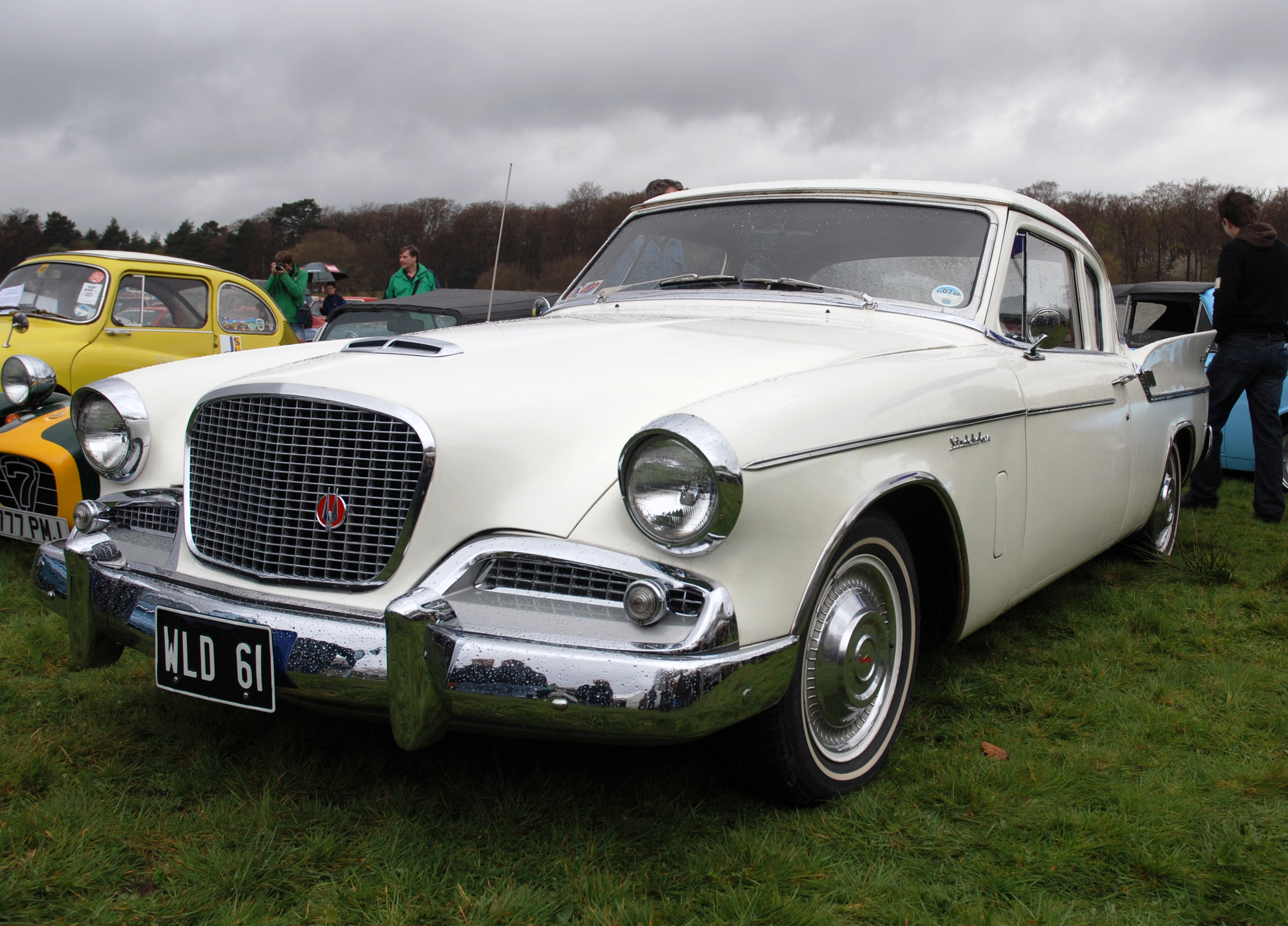
1960 Studebaker Hawk, export model with the 259 V8

Under the hood (at least for U.S. models), buyers could choose the newly-shrunken (to pre-'55 size) 90 HP 169.6 cu in (2.8 L) six or the 259 cu in (4.2 L) V8 of 180 or 195 HP (depending on the choice of carburetor). The 289 was no longer available.

The 1959 model year was Studebaker's first profitable year in six years, thanks mostly to the Lark, and the rising tide of sales lifted the Silver Hawk, which sold 7,788 examples.

While the Silver Hawk was the only model offered in 1959, it too was dropped for 1960, with all models called simply Hawks. Largely unchanged externally from the 1959, internally, the major change was the return of the 289-cubic-inch (4.7 L) V8 last used in 1958. This was the only engine available for U.S. orders in both 1960 and 1961, the last year of the finned Hawk. Some six-cylinder and 259 cu in (4.2 L) V8 models were built for export markets.

The 1961 models saw the limited return of a second paint color, beige, in a stripe along the base of the fin between the two lower moldings. Interiors gained the option of wide, comfortable bucket seats; customers could opt to team their 289 V8 with a new four-speed Borg-Warner manual transmission, the same model used in the Chevrolet Corvette.

== 1960-61 ==
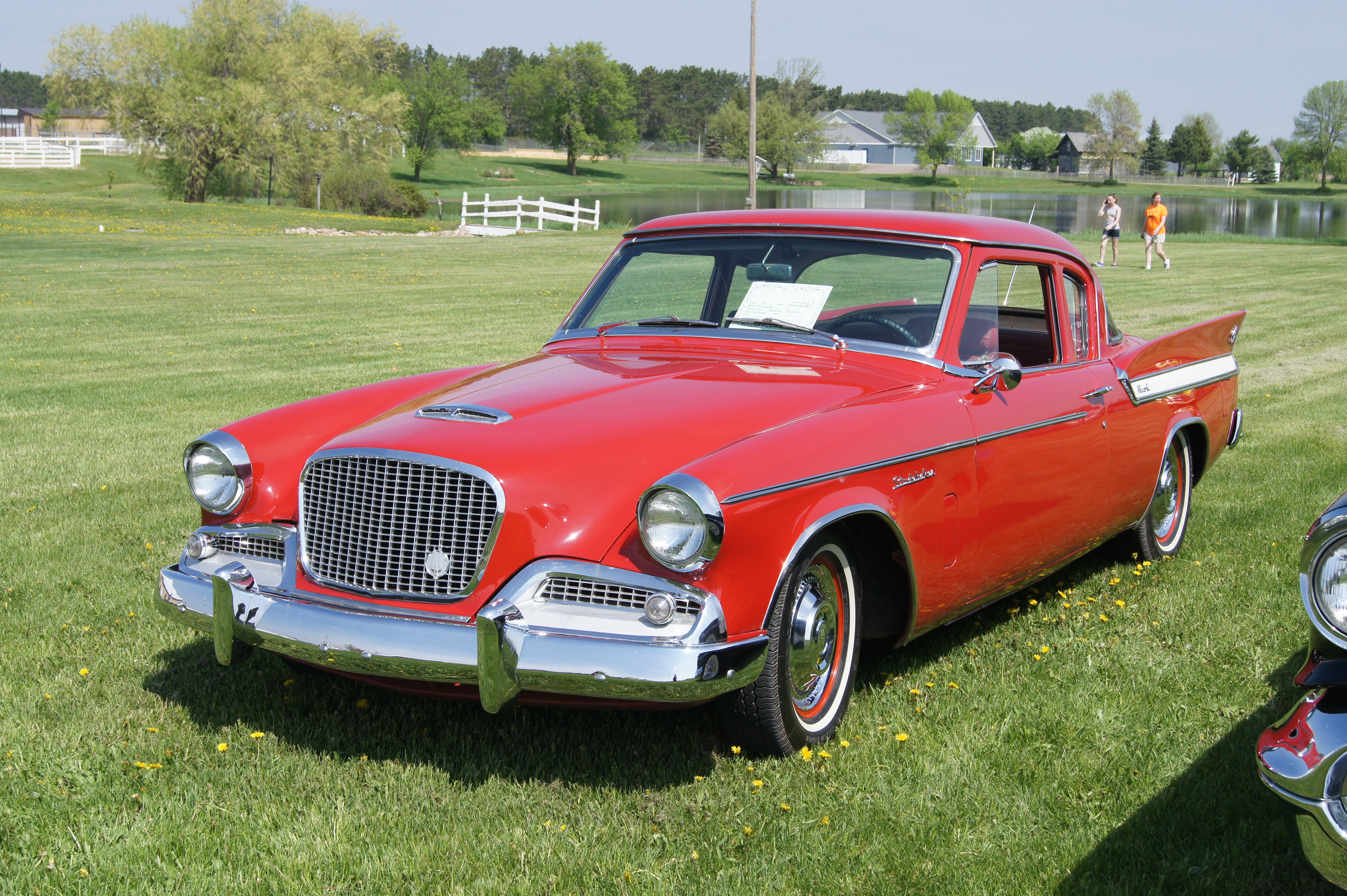
1961 Studebaker Hawk

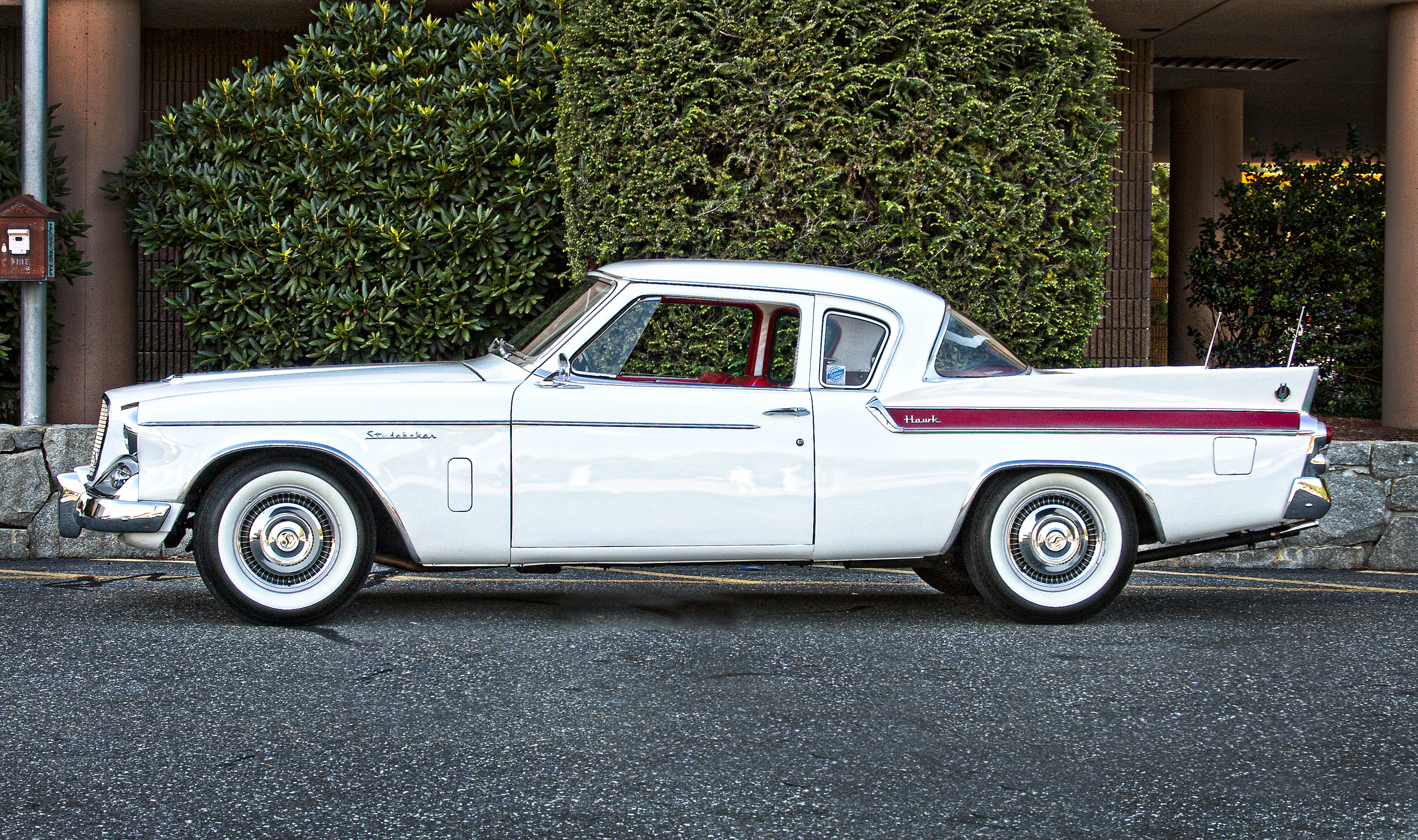
Sideview.

When the 1960 model year began, U.S. automakers were in the throes of a steel strike, and the shortage of steel hit Studebaker, which was a much smaller company than AMC or the Big Three, particularly hard. The 289 V-8 returned as the standard engine in the Hawk.

Studebaker had a proven sales winner in the 1959 Lark, which was continued into 1960 with little change. With steel in short supply, the company chose to focus on building as many Larks as possible to ensure an adequate supply for the company's dealers. This meant that Silver Hawk production for 1960, which had been scheduled to begin in November or December 1959, was delayed.

Sales of the Lark began to fall off in the closing months of 1959. By the beginning of February 1960, Hawks finally began to roll from the South Bend assembly line.

The Hawk lived on, and later that year a stock production model won its class in the 1960 Mobil Economy Run, delivering 22.9 miles per gallon.

The Hawk was replaced for 1962 by the restyled (by Brooks Stevens) Studebaker Gran Turismo Hawk.

== Legacy ==
The South Bend Silver Hawks, the former minor league baseball Single-A Arizona Diamondbacks affiliate took its name from this model. Originally the logo and lettering on the teams' uniforms mirrored the logo and lettering on the car, but this has since changed to a more cartoon-esque design. The team was renamed the South Bend Cubs, following the 2014 season.

A Studebaker Hawk was featured as the title character's personal car in the 2012 Australian TV series Jack Irish.

A Studebaker Hawk was featured in the TV series Criminal Minds. Driven by the antagonist.

The model's name is parodied (as the character Studebaker Hoch) in the Frank Zappa song Billy the Mountain.

In the Roxy Music song Virginia Plain there is also a reference to Studebaker in the lyric ‘Far beyond the pale horizon Some place near the desert strand Where my Studebaker takes me That's where I'll make my stand’
