= Studebaker Light Four =

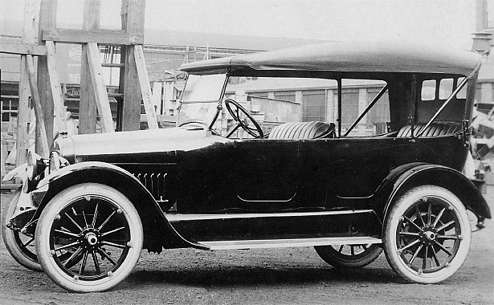
- Studebaker Light Four touring car

Overview
- Manufacturer: Studebaker
- Model years: 1918–1919
- Assembly: Studebaker Automotive Plant, South Bend, Indiana, United States

Body and chassis
- Class: mid-size
- Layout: Front-engine, rear-wheel-drive

The Studebaker Light Four was an automobile produced by the Studebaker Corporation of South Bend, Indiana, in 1918 and 1919. The car was officially designated Model SH Series 19 and was available as a touring car, sedan, and roadster.

The Light Four had a 112 in (2,800 mm) wheelbase, and was powered by Studebaker's side-valve, inline, 192 cu in (3,150 cc), four-cylinder engine, delivering 40 bhp (30 kW) at 2,000 rpm. It shared the chassis and length with the Studebaker Light Six.

The Light Four was dropped in 1920, as Studebaker shifted its model range to the more popular Light Six, Special Six, and Big Six.

Because of its low production numbers, the Light Four is considered to be a rare model by Studebaker collectors of this era of automobile. Retail prices ranged from US$1,125 to $1,685 ($24,080 to $36,067 in 2025 dollars).
