= Studebaker Dictator =

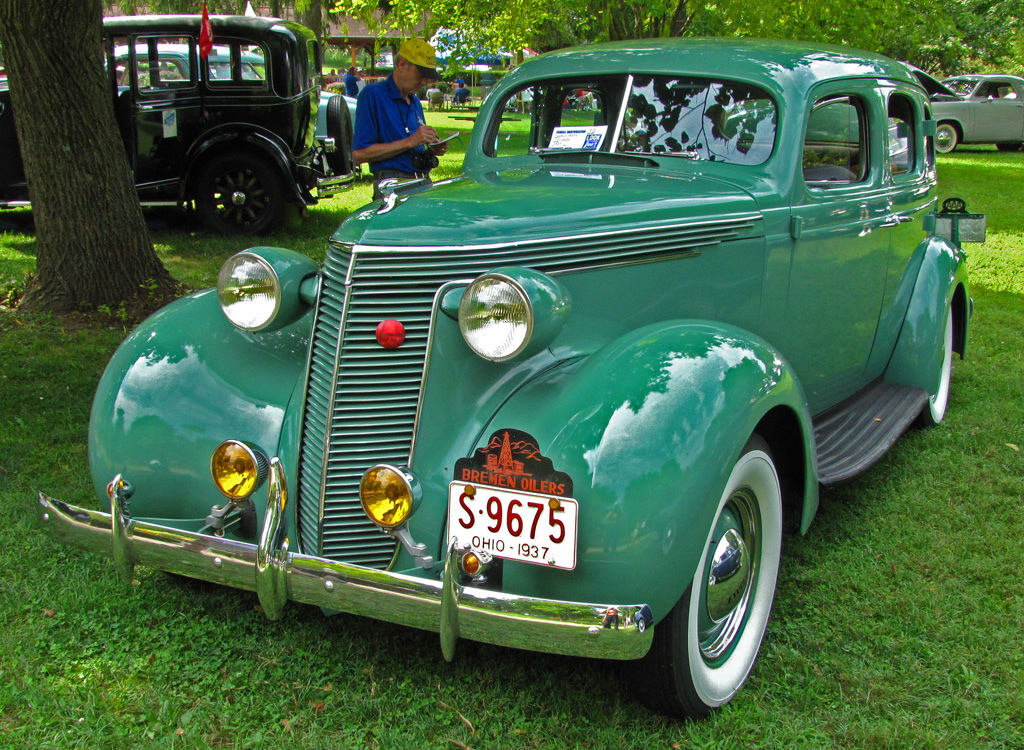
- 1937 Studebaker Dictator four-door sedan

Overview
- Manufacturer: Studebaker
- Also called: Studebaker Director (international)
- Model years: 1927–1937
- Assembly: United States: Studebaker Automotive Plant, South Bend, Indiana

Body and chassis
- Class: Mid-size
- Layout: Front-engine, rear-wheel-drive

Chronology
- Predecessor: Studebaker Light Six
- Successor: Studebaker Champion

The Studebaker Dictator is an automobile produced by the Studebaker Corporation of South Bend, Indiana, United States, from 1927 until 1937. Model year 1928 was the first full year of Dictator production.

In the mid-1920s, Studebaker began renaming its vehicles. The model previously known as the Studebaker Standard Six became the Dictator during the 1927 model year—internally designated model GE. The name was intended to connote that the model "dictated the standard" that other automobile makes would be obliged to follow. Dictators were available in a full range of body-styles.

The Dictator was Studebaker's lowest-price model, followed (in ascending order) by the Studebaker Commander and Studebaker President series. Also, a Chancellor model was offered in 1927, but that year only. In June 1929, Studebaker began offering an eight-cylinder engine for the Dictator series (221 cubic inches (3,620 cc), 70 bhp at 3,200 rpm), designed by Barney Roos, though the old six-cylinder option was continued for another year. No 1933 Dictator was produced due to Studebaker's bankruptcy, and a redesigned, lower-priced model was released in 1934 with a six-cylinder engine. The eight-cylinder engine was then on only available for the Commander and President models.

== Name ==
Studebaker marketed its Standard Six as the Director overseas. Though it had not caused problems in the United States, Studebaker discontinued the Dictator name in 1937, calling it the Commander, last used by the maker in 1935. At that time, Raymond Loewy and Helen Dryden were working on new concepts for body design and customer appeal.

== Gallery ==
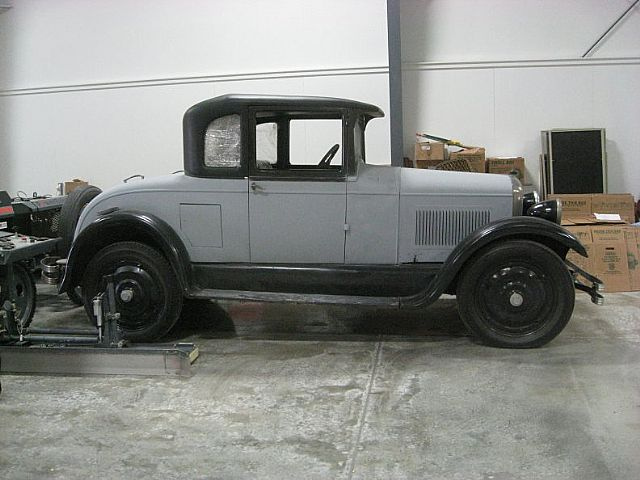
1927 Business Coupe

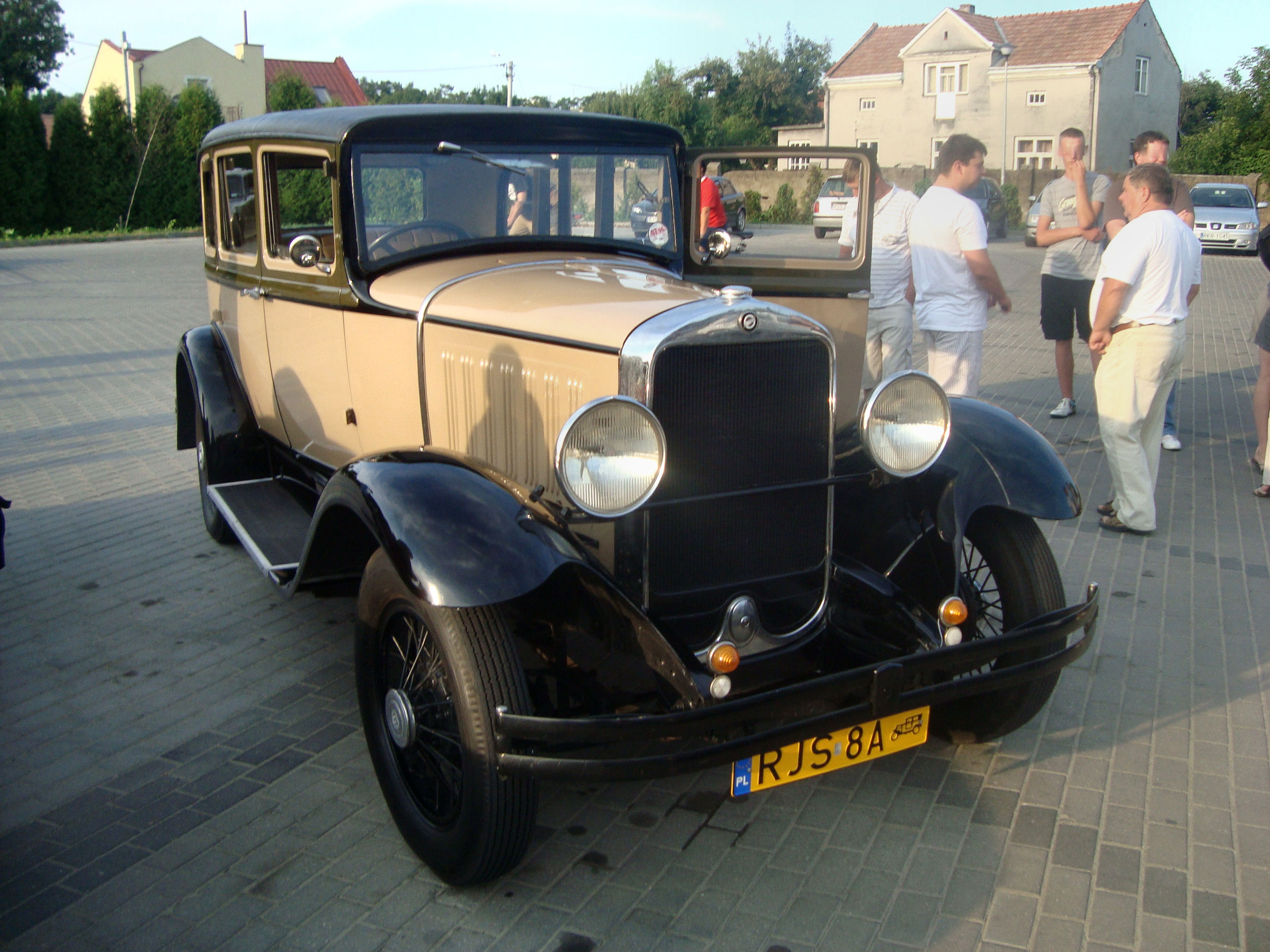
1927 4-door sedan

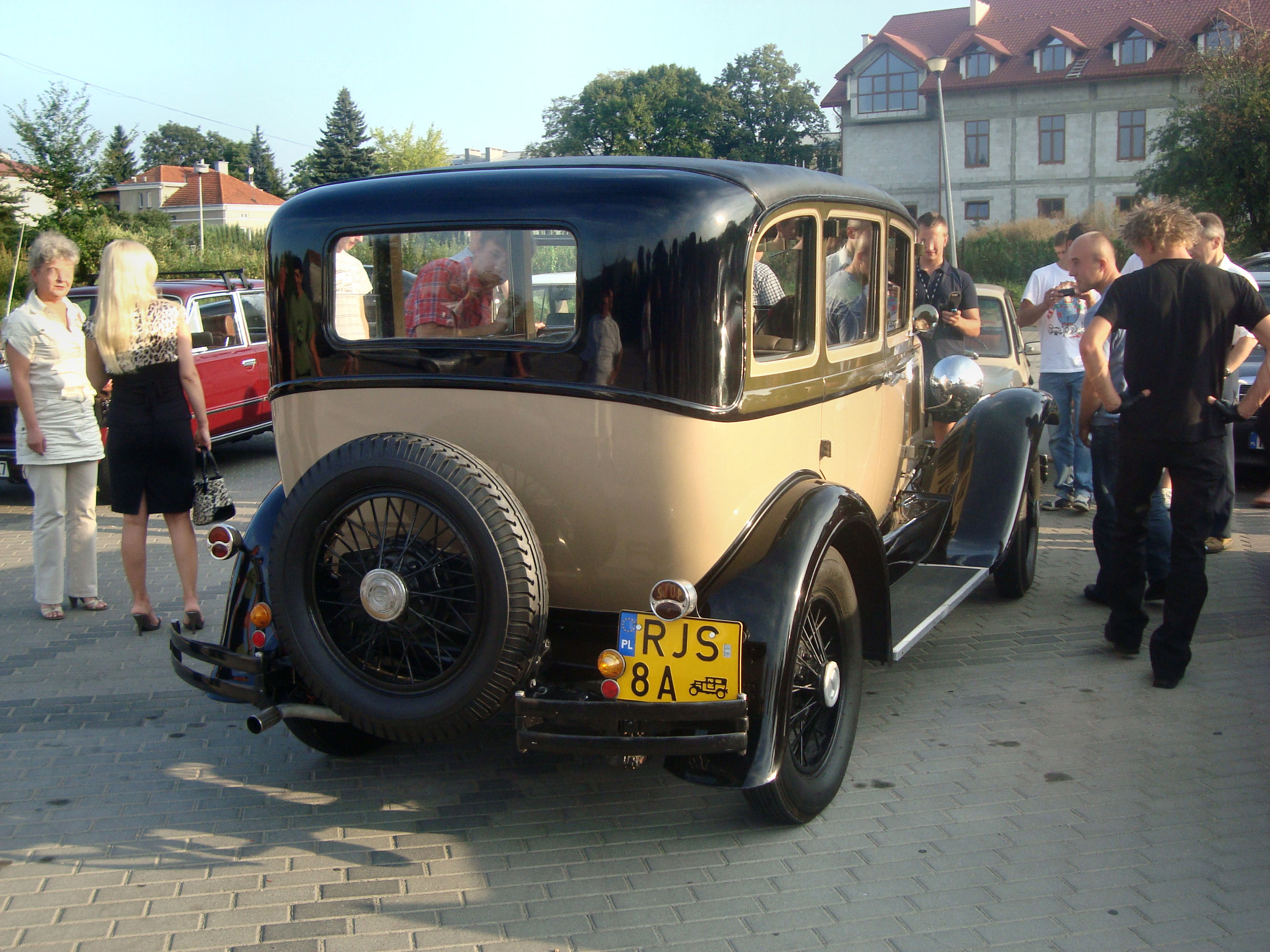
1927 4-door sedan

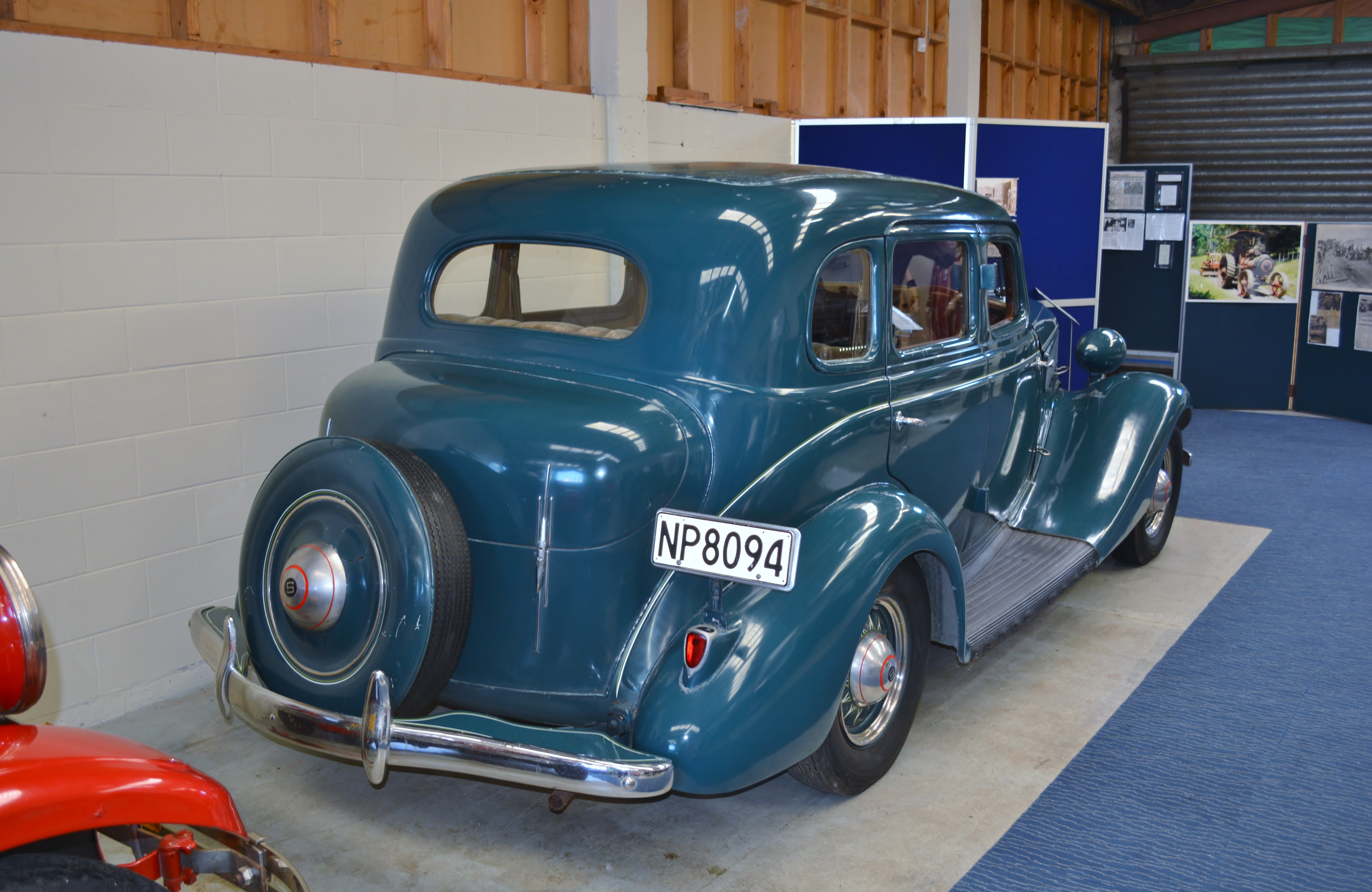
1935 four-door sedan

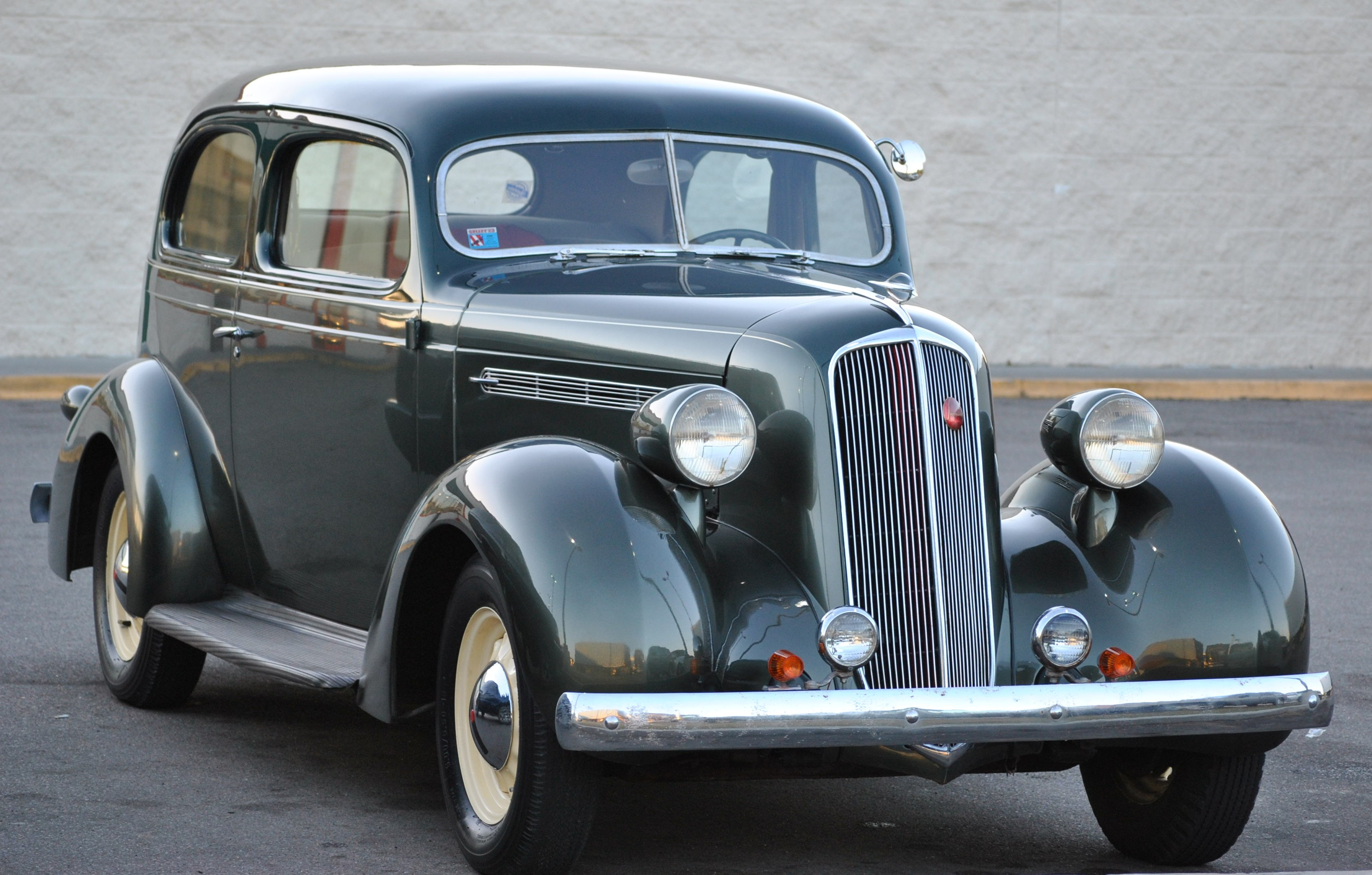
1936 two-door sedan

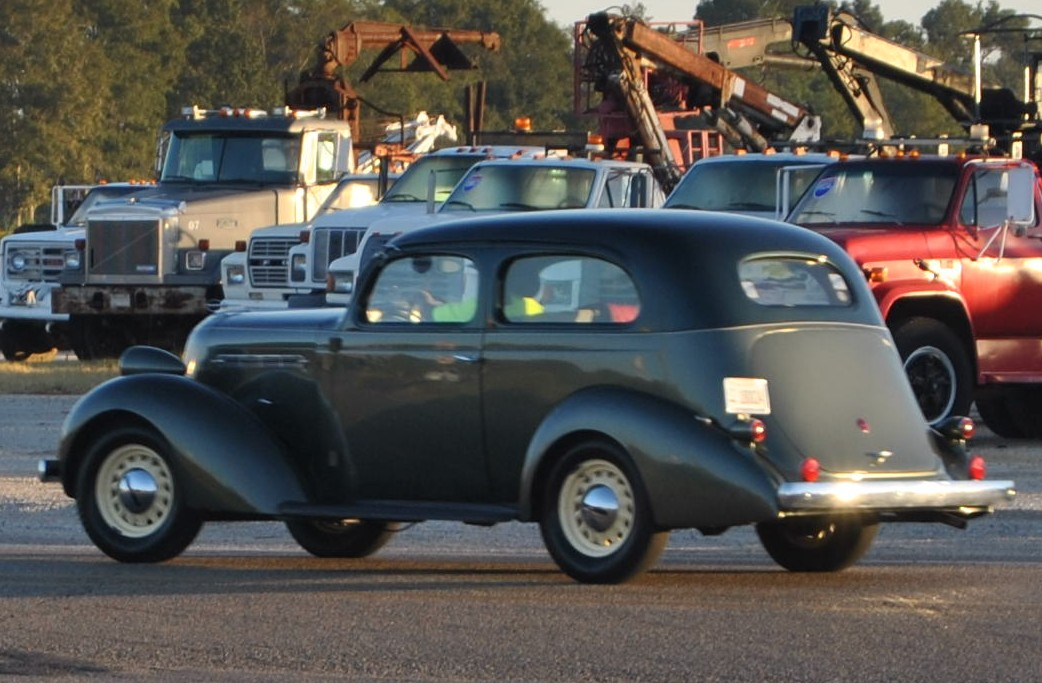
1936 two-door sedan
