= Studebaker Champion =

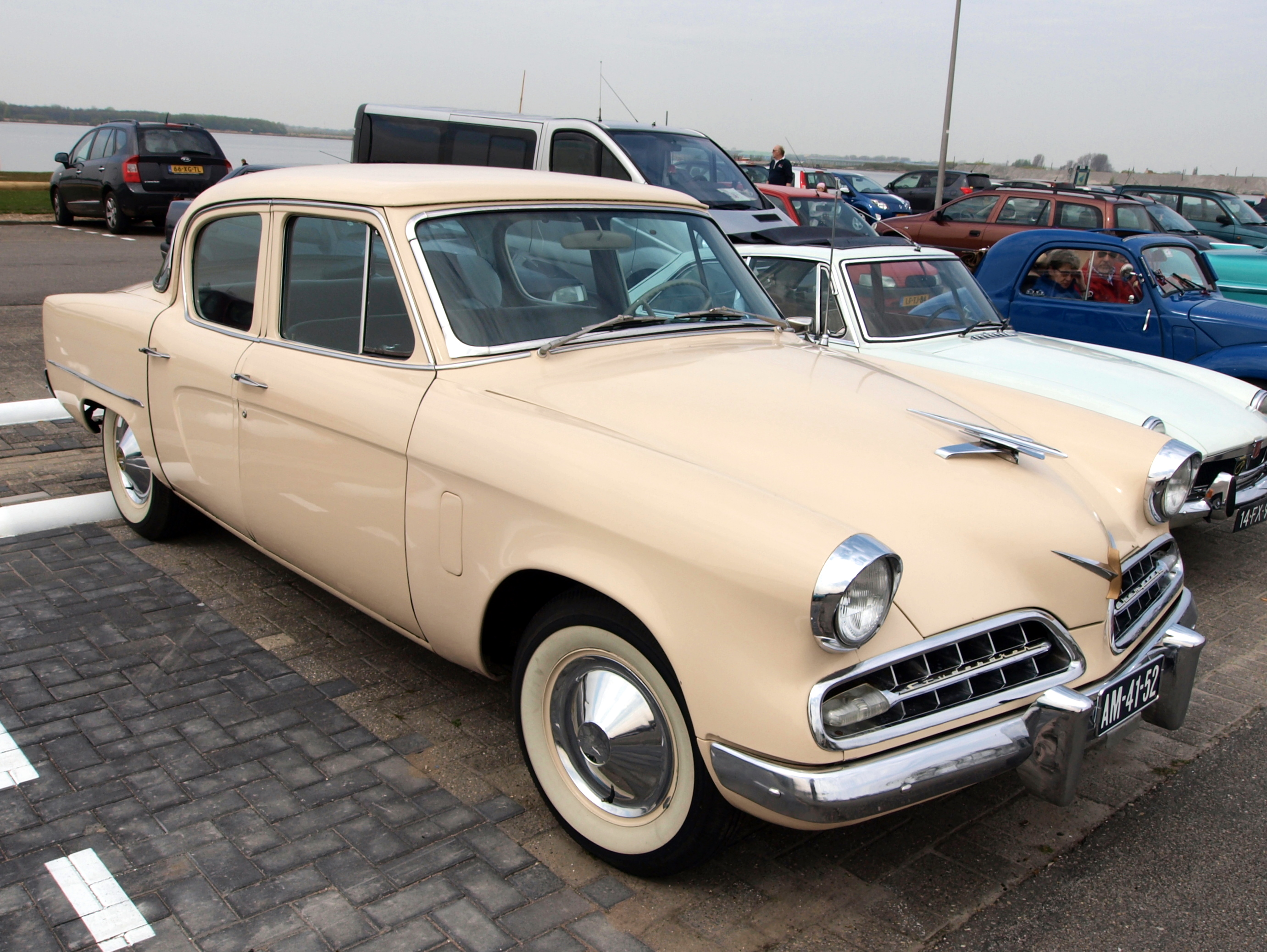
- 1954 Champion 4-door sedan

Overview
- Manufacturer: Studebaker
- Production: 1939–1942, 1946-1958
- Assembly: Studebaker Automotive Plant, South Bend, Indiana, United States; Studebaker Automotive Plant, Vernon, California, United States

Body and chassis
- Class: Full-size car (1939–1952); Mid-size car (1952–1958)
- Body style: 2-door sedan 4-door sedan 2-door coupe 4-door station wagon 2-door station wagon 2-door convertible
- Layout: FR layout

Chronology
- Predecessor: Studebaker Dictator
- Successor: Studebaker Lark

The Studebaker Champion is the model name given to a series of automobiles produced by the Studebaker Corporation of South Bend, Indiana, from the beginning of the 1939 model year until 1958. It was a full-size car in its first three generations and a mid-size car in its fourth and fifth generation models, serving as the junior model to the Commander.

== Background ==
The success of the Champion in 1939 was imperative to Studebaker's survival following weak sales during the 1938 model year. Unlike most other cars, the Champion was designed from a "clean sheet" and had no restrictions caused by necessarily using older parts or requiring the subsequent use of its components in heavier vehicles. Market research guided the selection of features, but a key principle adhered to was the engineering watchword "weight is the enemy". For its size, it was one of the lightest cars of its era. Its compact straight-six engine outlasted the model itself and was produced to the end of the 1964 model year, with a change to an OHV design in 1961.

The Champion was one of Studebaker's best-selling models because of its low price (US$660 for the 2-door business coupe in 1939, equal to $15,276 today), durable engine, and styling. The car's ponton styling was authored by industrial designer Raymond Loewy, who had been under contract with Studebaker for the design of their automobiles. Champions won Mobilgas economy runs by posting the highest fuel efficiency tests. During World War II, Champions were coveted for their high efficiency at a time when gas was rationed in the United States. From 1943 to 1945, the Champion engine was used as the powerplant for the Studebaker M29 Weasel personnel and cargo carrier, which also used four sets of the Champion's leaf springs arranged transversely for its bogie suspension.

The Champion was phased out in 1958 in preparation for the introduction of the 1959 Studebaker Lark. Prior to this, Studebaker had been placed under receivership, and the company was attempting to return to a profitable position.

== First generation ==
First generation
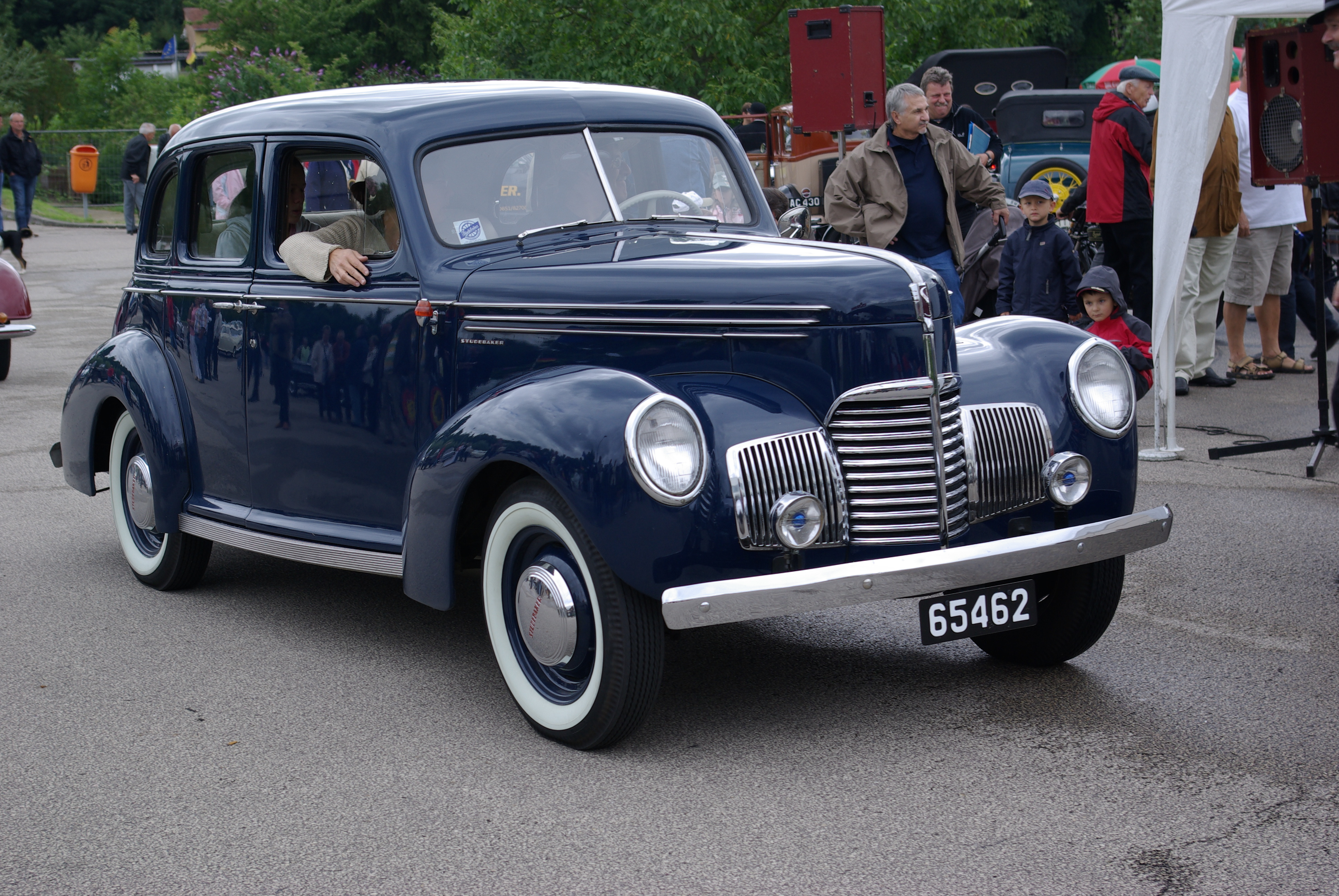
- 1939 Series G 4-Door Sedan

Overview
- Production: 1939–1941

Body and chassis
- Class: Full-size car
- Body style: 2-door sedan 4-door sedan
- Layout: FR layout

Powertrain
- Engine: 164.3 cu in (2.7 L) I6

Dimensions
- Length: 188.75 in (4,794 mm)

The Champion was introduced in 1939. Following the design trends of the time, the grille and headlights were partially integrated. Deluxe models came with arm rests and dual wipers. The 164.3 cu in (2.7 L) I6 engine produced 78 horsepower (58 kW; 79 PS). In 1940, Studebaker claimed 27.25 mpg_{‑US} (8.63 L/100 km; 32.73 mpg_{‑imp}). In 1941, the bodies were given a more streamlined look with a wider, lower grille.

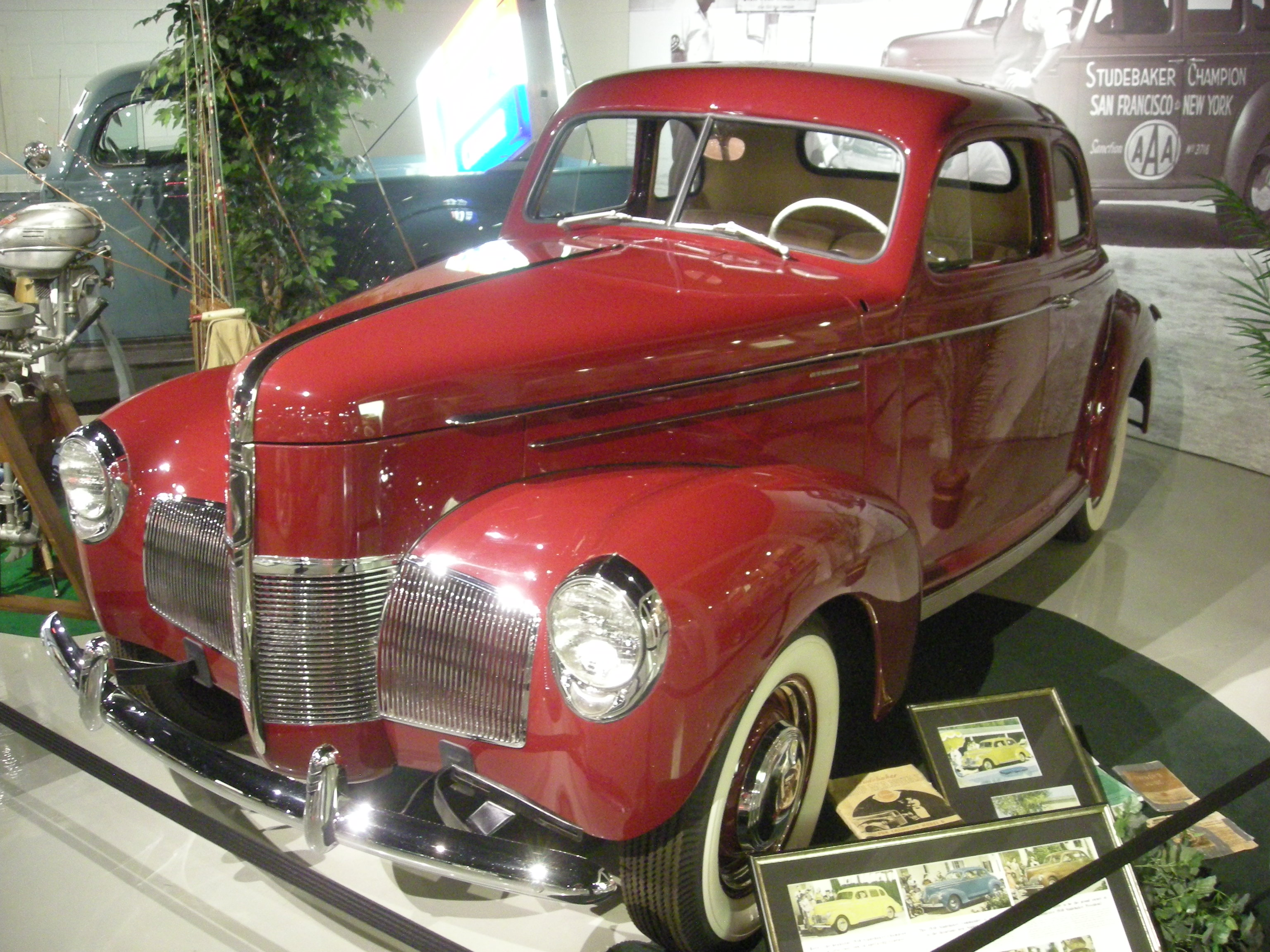
1940 Business Coupe

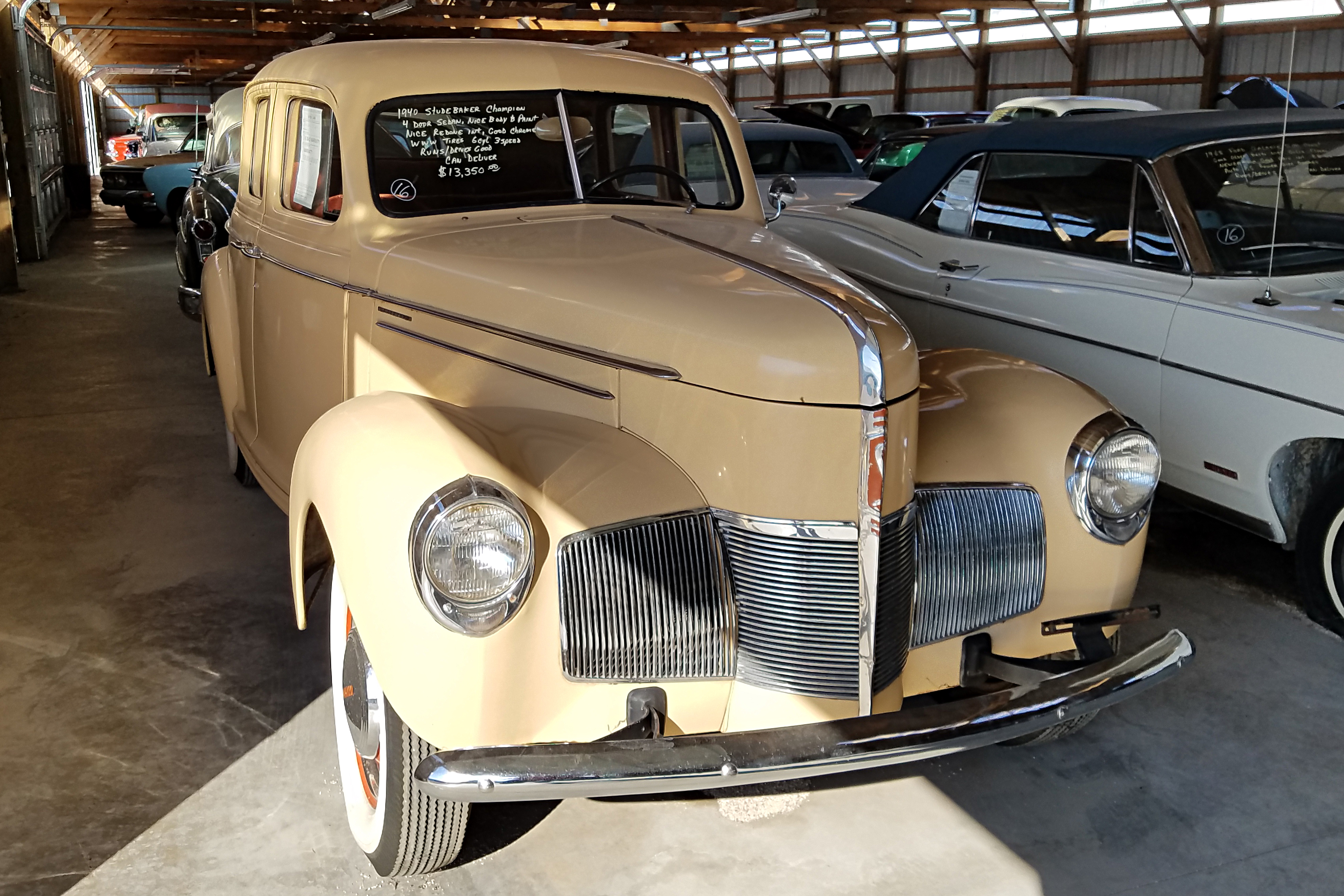
1940 4-door Sedan

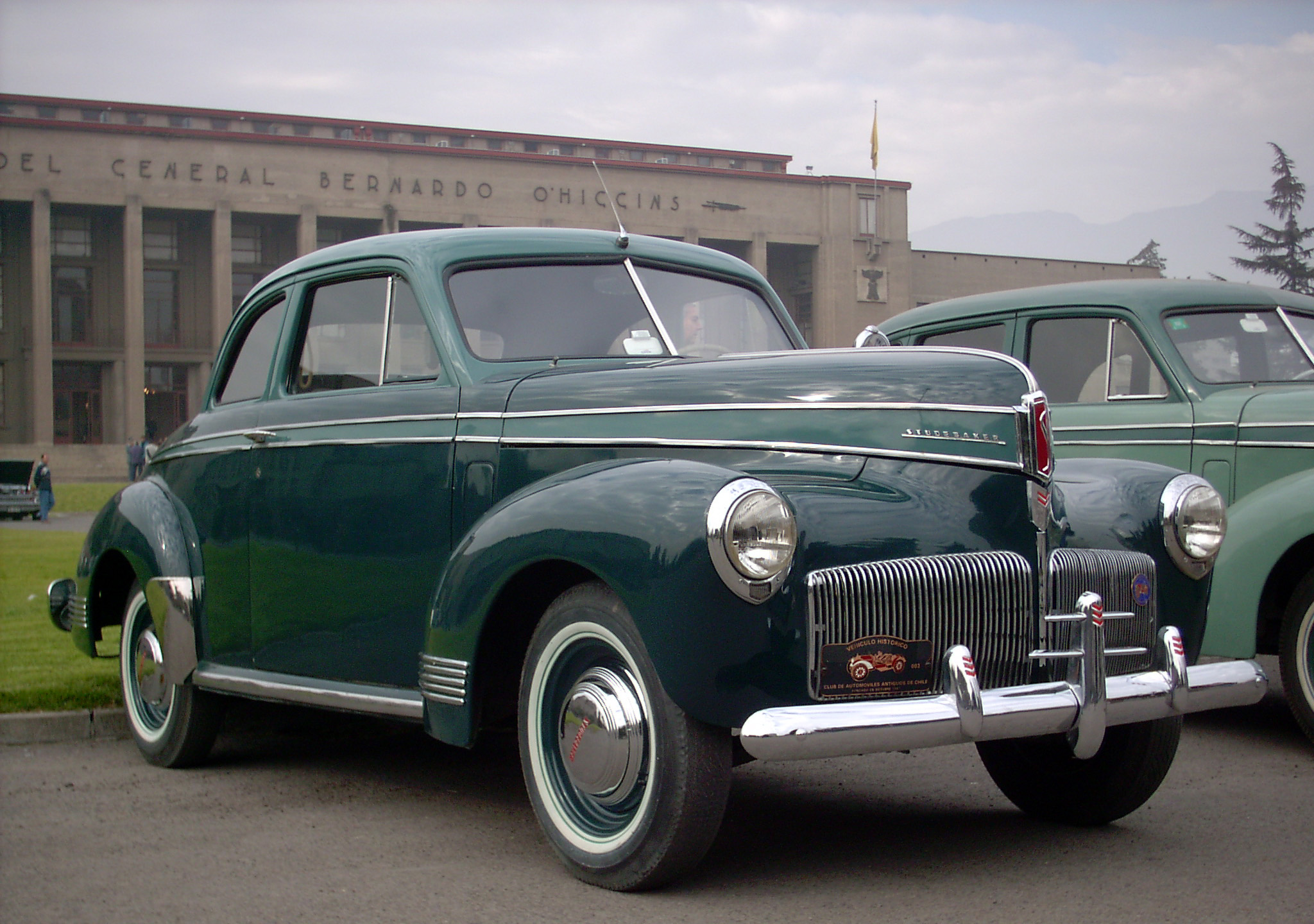
1941 2-door Sedan

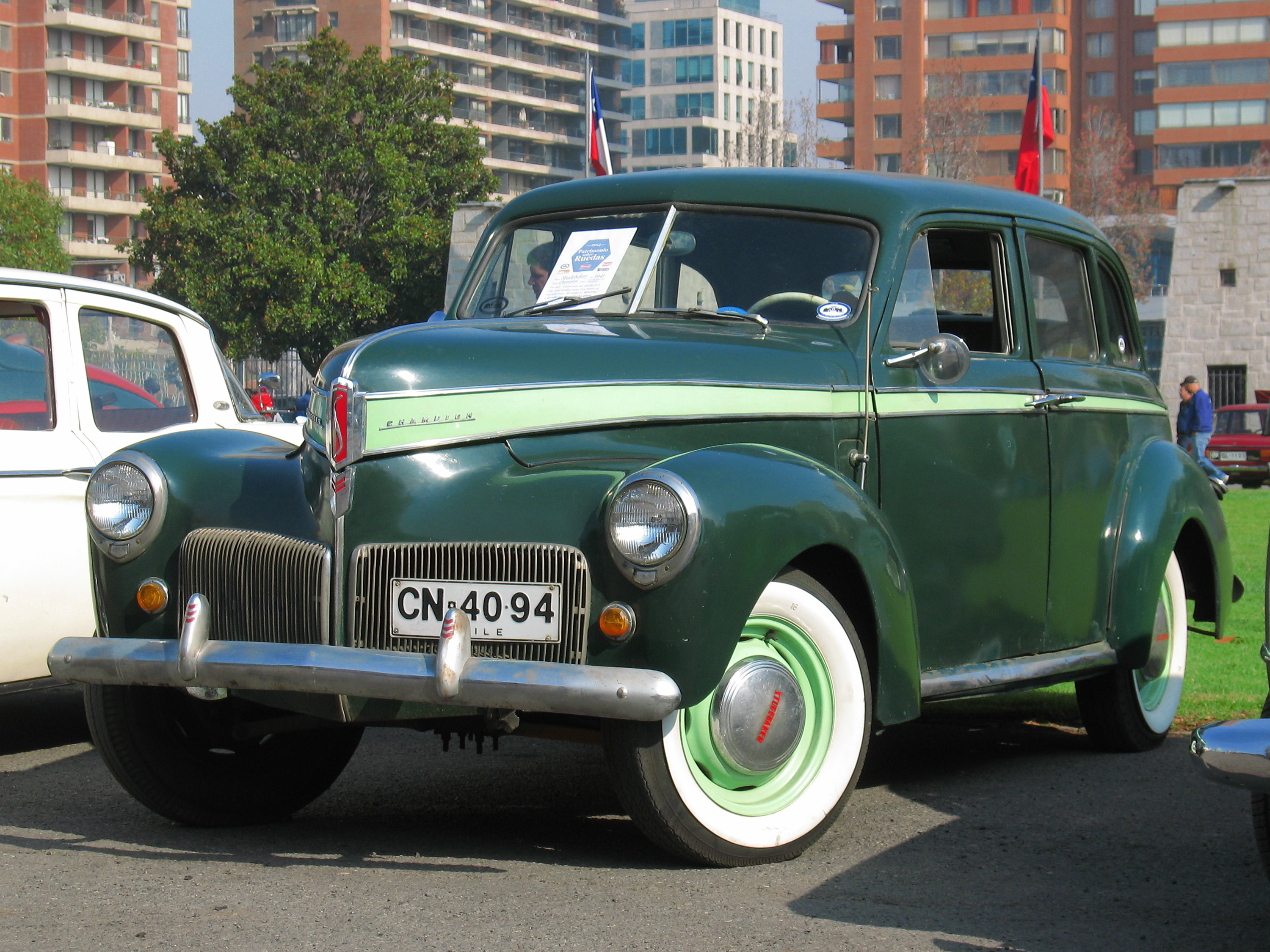
1941 4-door Sedan

== Second generation ==
Second generation
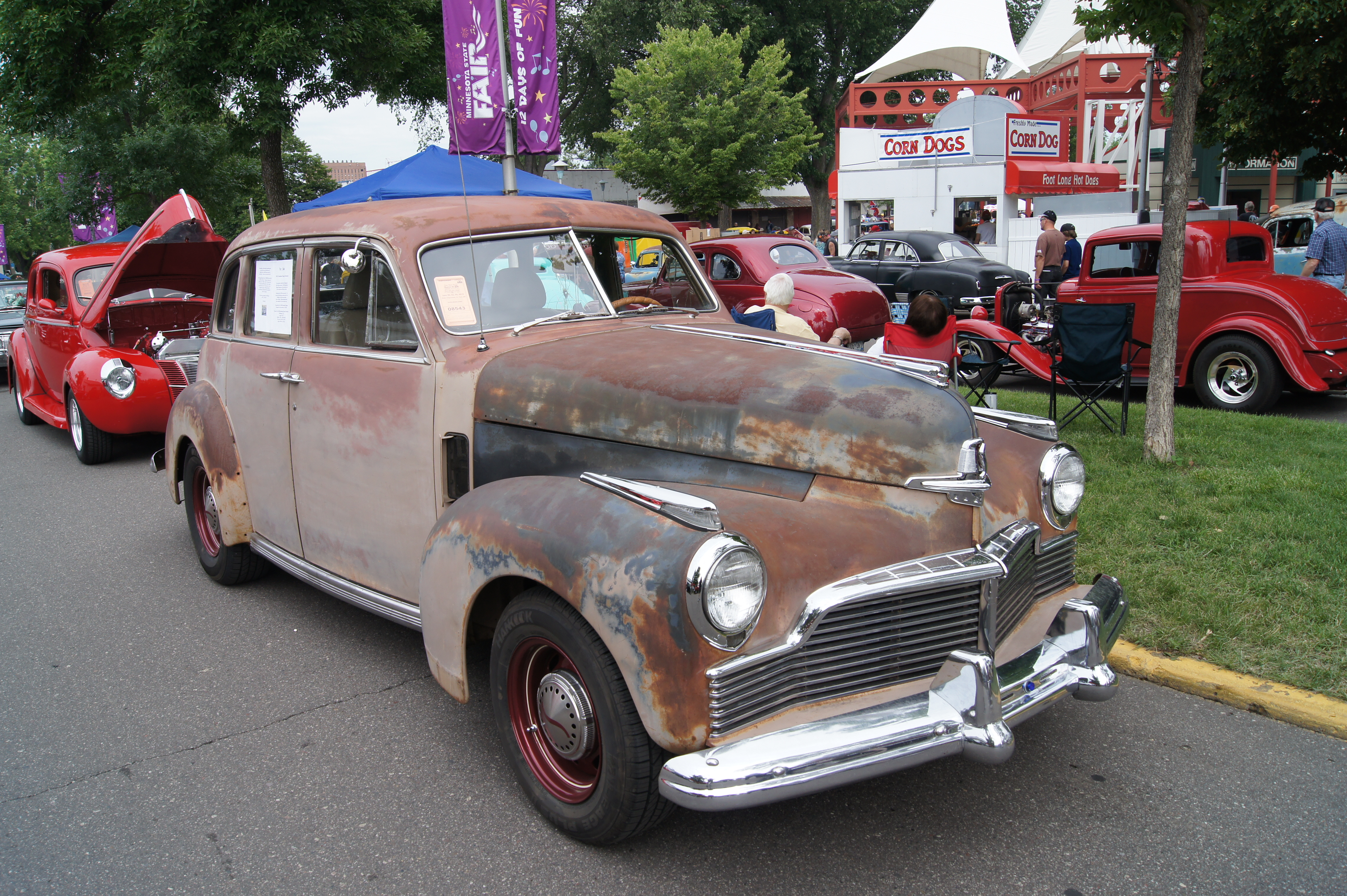
- 1946 Studebaker Skyway Champion Cruising Sedan

Overview
- Production: 1942–1946

Body and chassis
- Class: Full-size car
- Body style: 2-door sedan 4-door sedan 2-door coupé

Dimensions
- Wheelbase: 110 in (2,794 mm)
- Length: 193 in (4,902 mm)

The second generation Champion arrived for the abbreviated 1942 model year. In 1946, Studebaker built a limited number of cars based on this body shell in preparation for its new body and design rollout in 1947. All Studebakers built in 1946 were designated Skyway Champion models. Only the Champion series was produced, it being the most popular before the war.

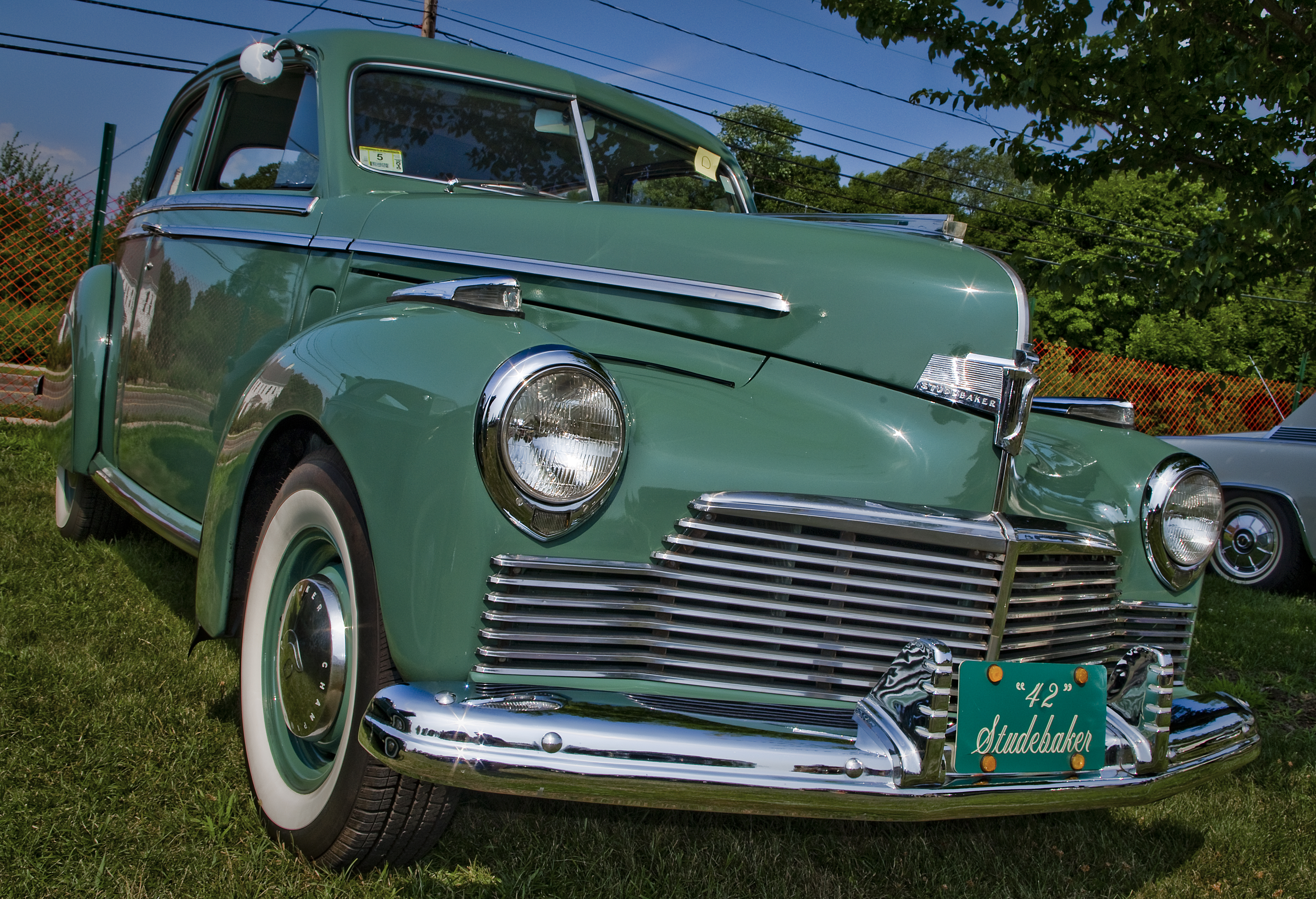
1942 4-door sedan

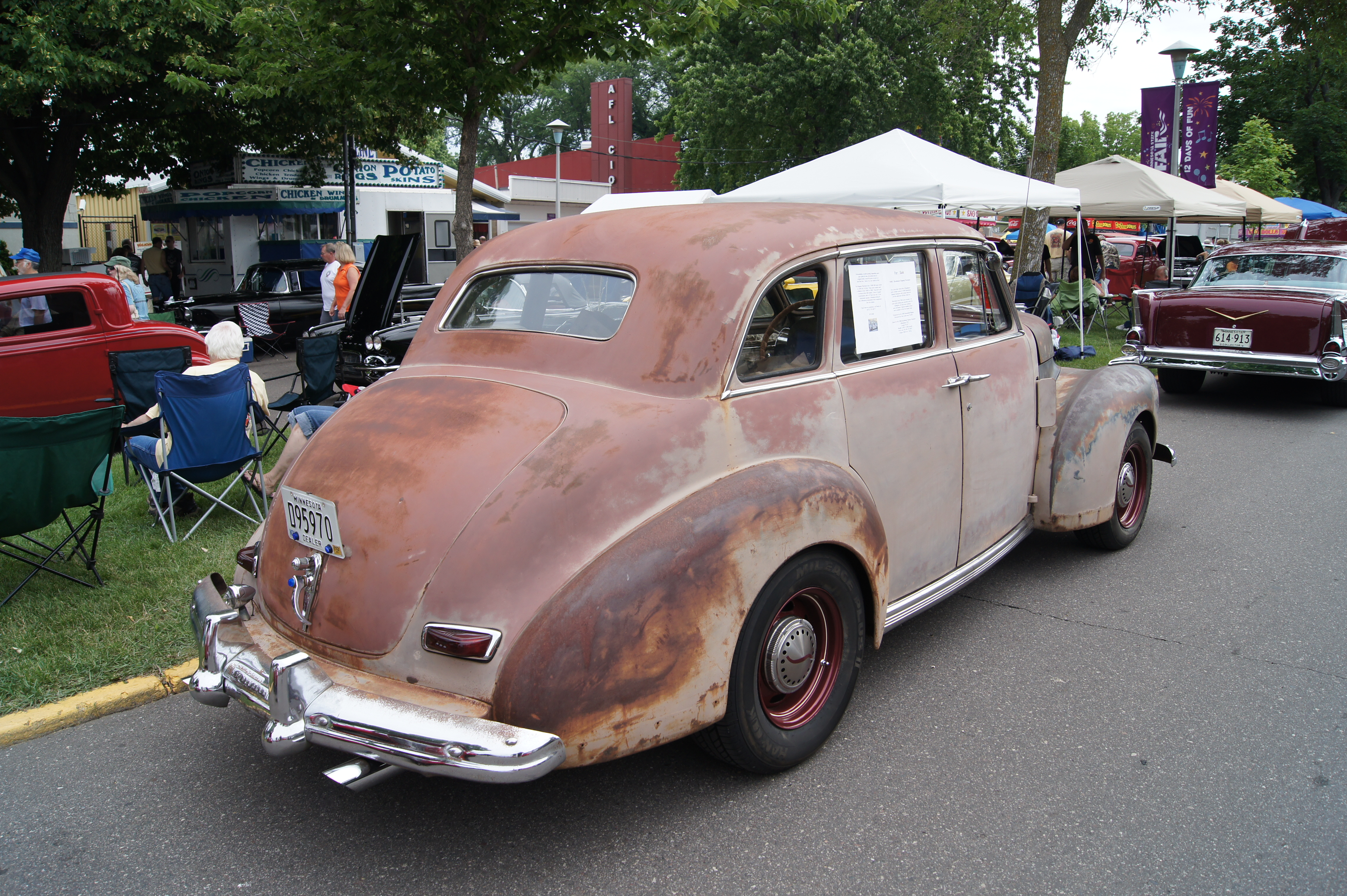
1946 Studebaker Skyway Champion Cruising Sedan

== Third generation ==
Third generation
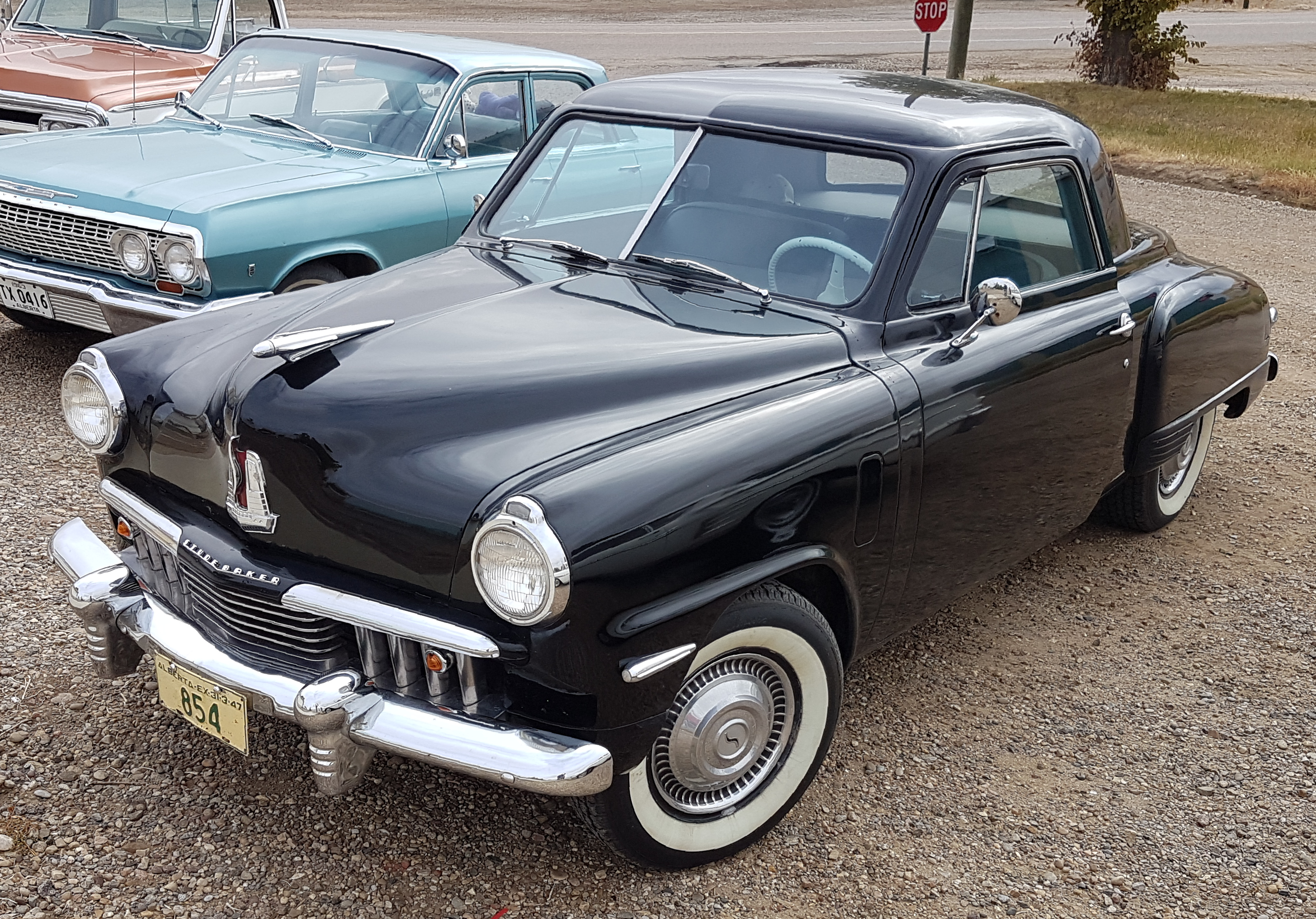
- 1947 Studebaker Champion Business Coupe

Overview
- Manufacturer: Studebaker
- Production: 1947–1952

Body and chassis
- Class: Full-size car
- Body style: 4-door sedan 2-door sedan 2-door convertible 2-door 3-passenger coupe 2-door 5-passenger Starlight coupe
- Layout: FR layout

Powertrain
- Engine: 169.9 cu in (2.8 L) I6

Dimensions
- Wheelbase: 112 in (2,845 mm)
- Length: 1947: 192 in (4,877 mm); 1950: 197.3 in (5,011 mm)

In 1947, Studebaker completely redesigned the Champion and the Commander, making them the first new cars after World War II. The styling included a new rear window, flat front fenders in the ponton style which had just gone mainstream, as well as convenience features like backlight illumination for gauges and automatic courtesy lights. The Champion made up 65.08% of the total sales for the automaker in 1947.

The 169.9 cu in (2.8 L) I6 engine produced 80 hp (60 kW; 81 PS) in 1947. In 1950, output was increased to 85 hp (63 kW; 86 PS). Also, new styling (new grille, sheet metal, and rear end) was introduced, as well as an automatic transmission by Borg-Warner.

One of the new styling features on the cars was the wraparound, "greenhouse" rear window that was on 2-door 5-passenger coupes from 1947 to 1951; in 1949 it was given its own name, the Starlight coupe. The "spinner" grille was introduced in 1950, similar to that of a 1949 Ford, but was dropped again for the 1952 model year.

A single four-door, wood-bodied station wagon prototype was also designed. It appeared at several car shows, but was never put into production. The car was then driven for several years by employees to run company errands. Around 1955, the body was removed from the chassis and was sent to the secret graveyard in the wooded infield of the high-speed oval at the company's proving ground west of South Bend. In the early 1970s, members of the Studebaker Drivers Club discovered the body of the wagon prototype. Around 1980, members of the club were allowed to remove the wagon prototype for preservation. After a multi-year restoration, the car was put on display at the Studebaker National Museum.

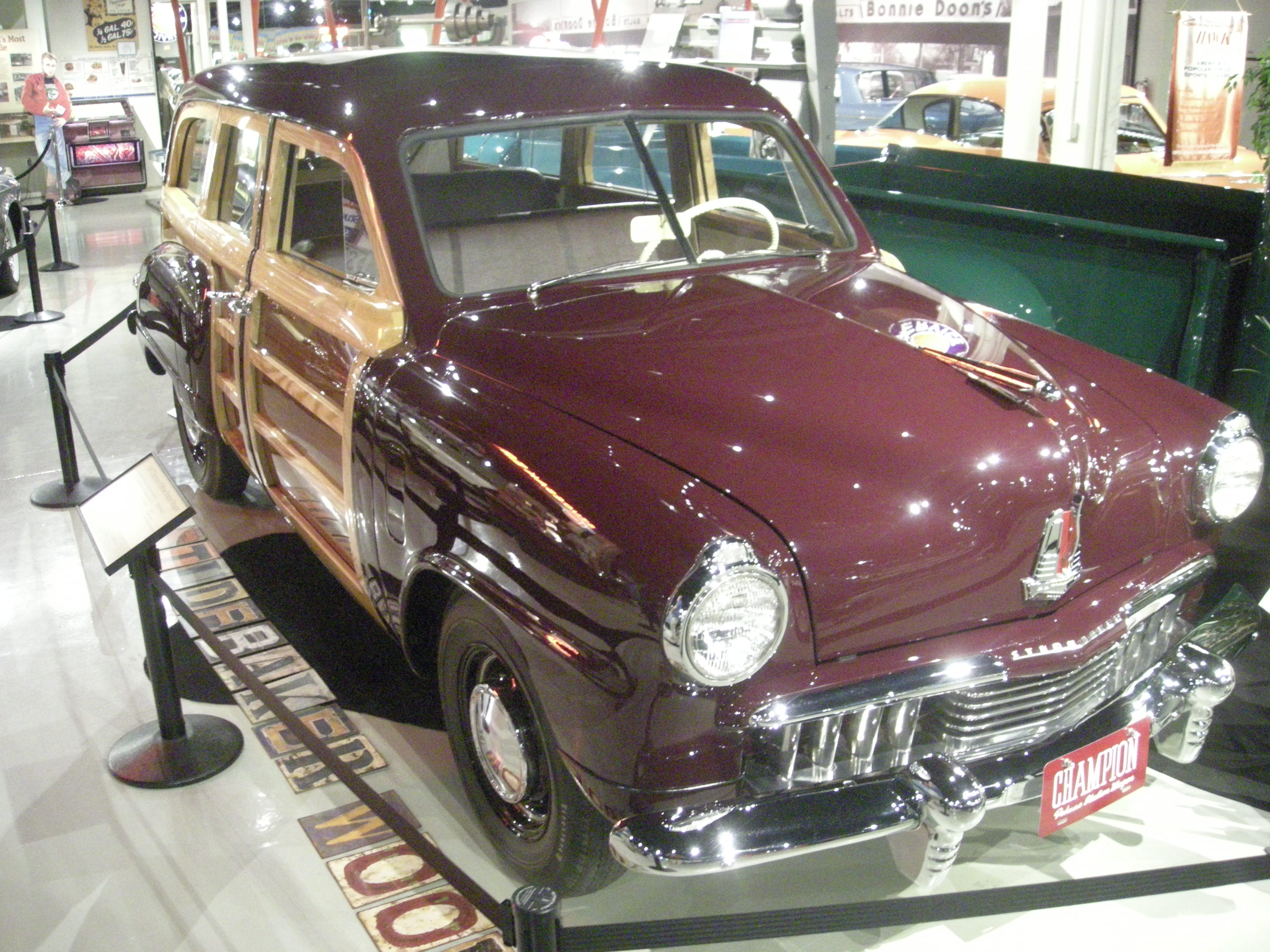
1947 Champion Deluxe Station Wagon prototype

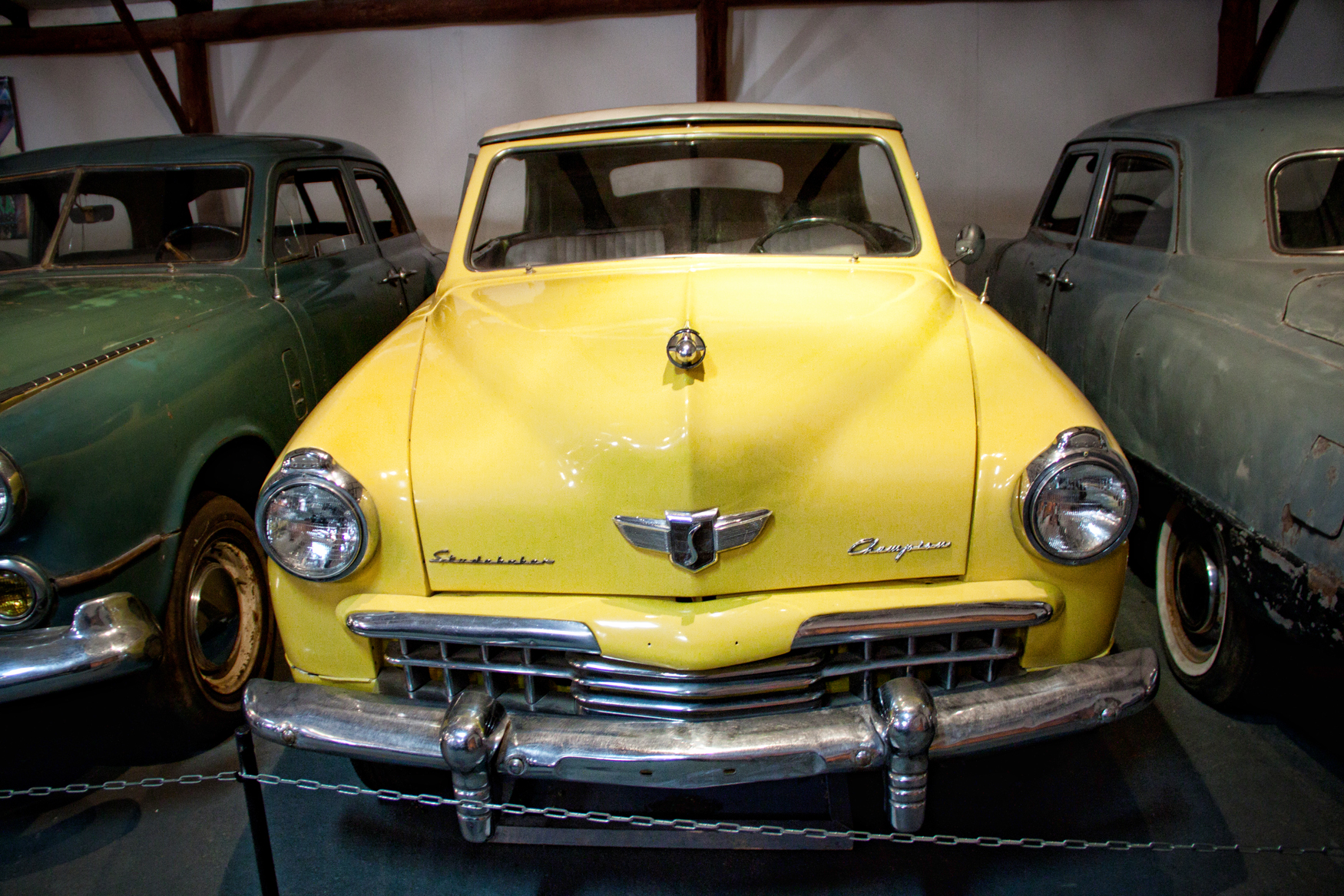
1948 Studebaker Champion

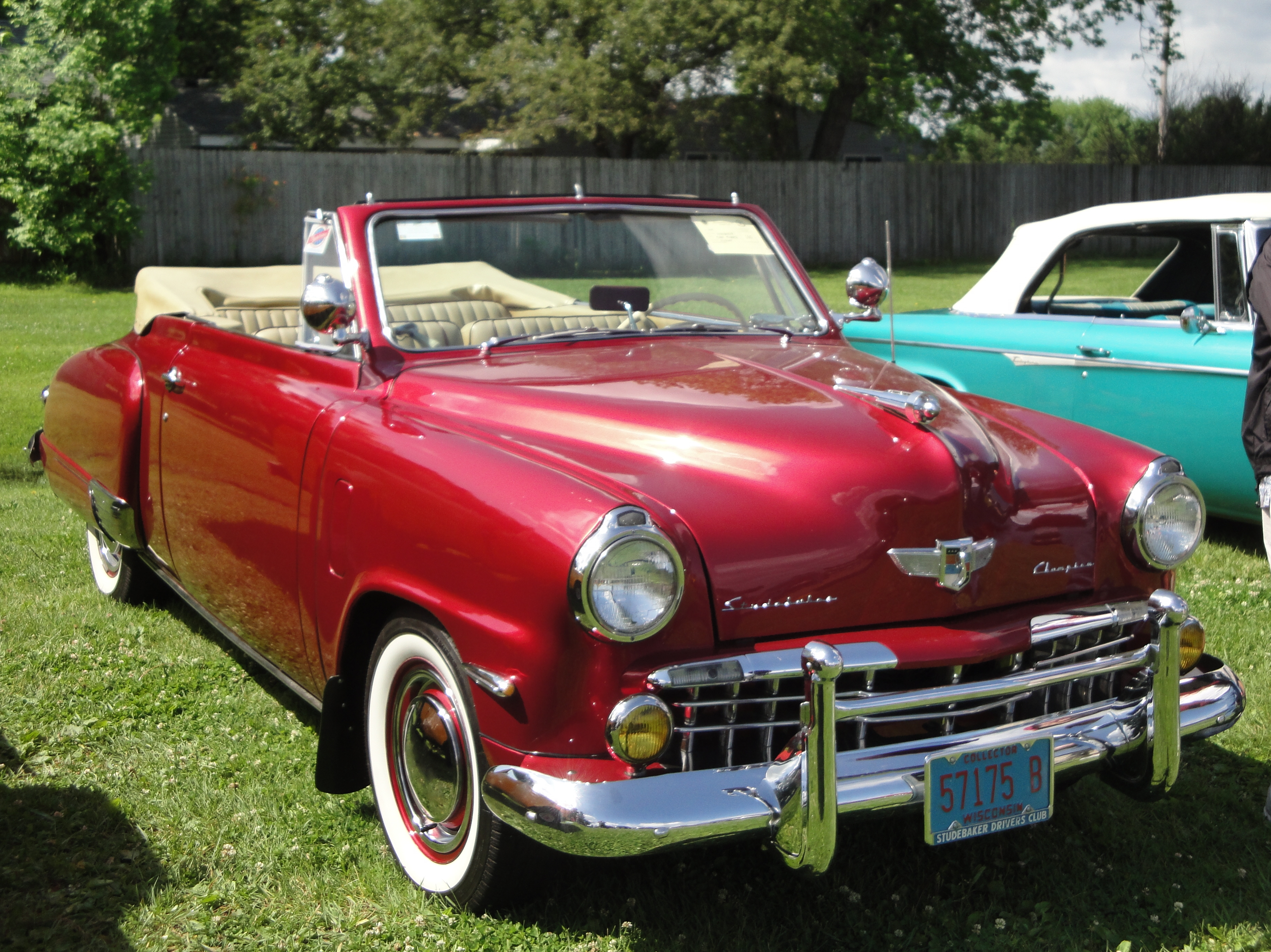
1949 Studebaker Champion Regal De Luxe Convertible

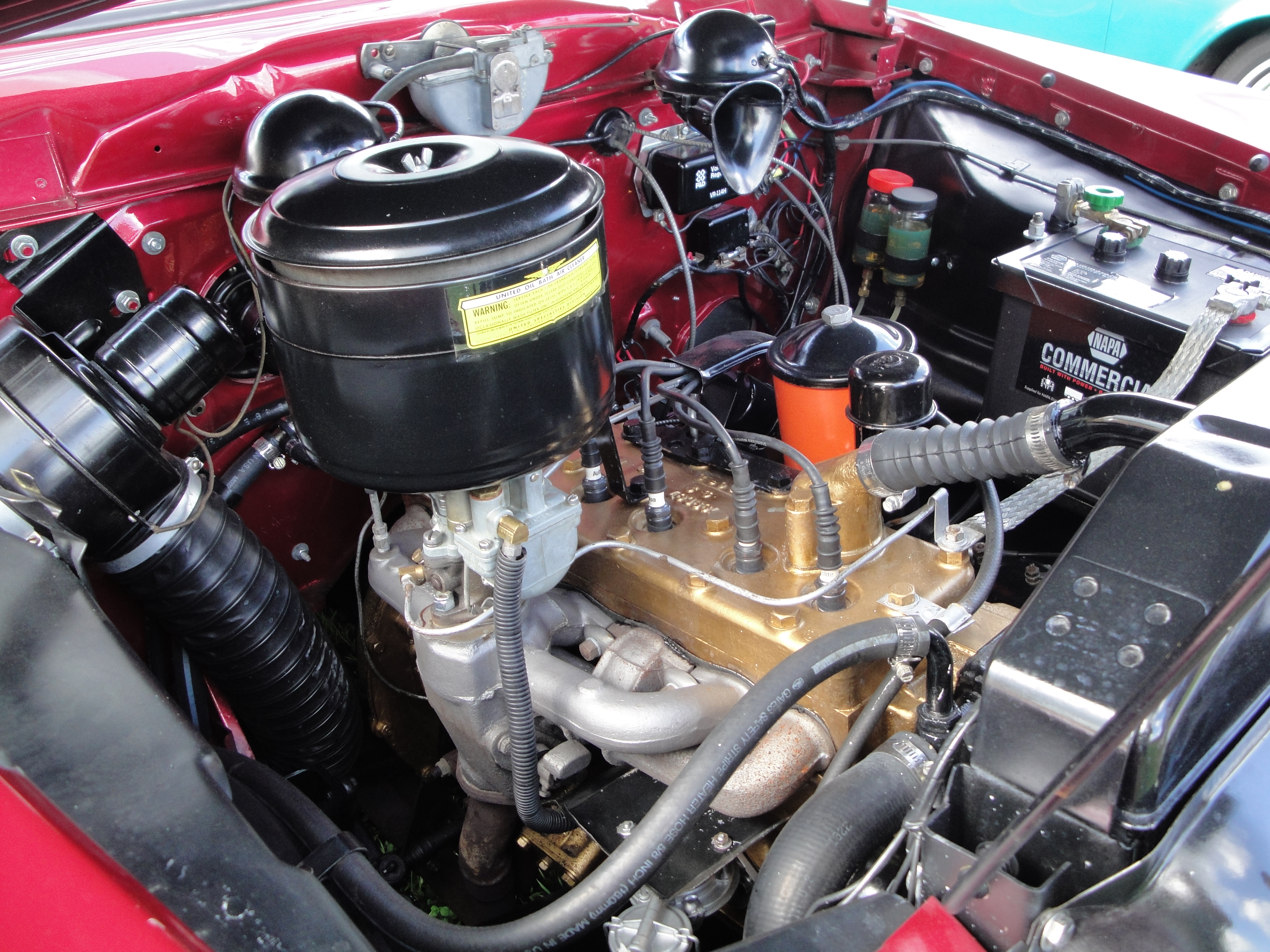
1949 straight-six engine

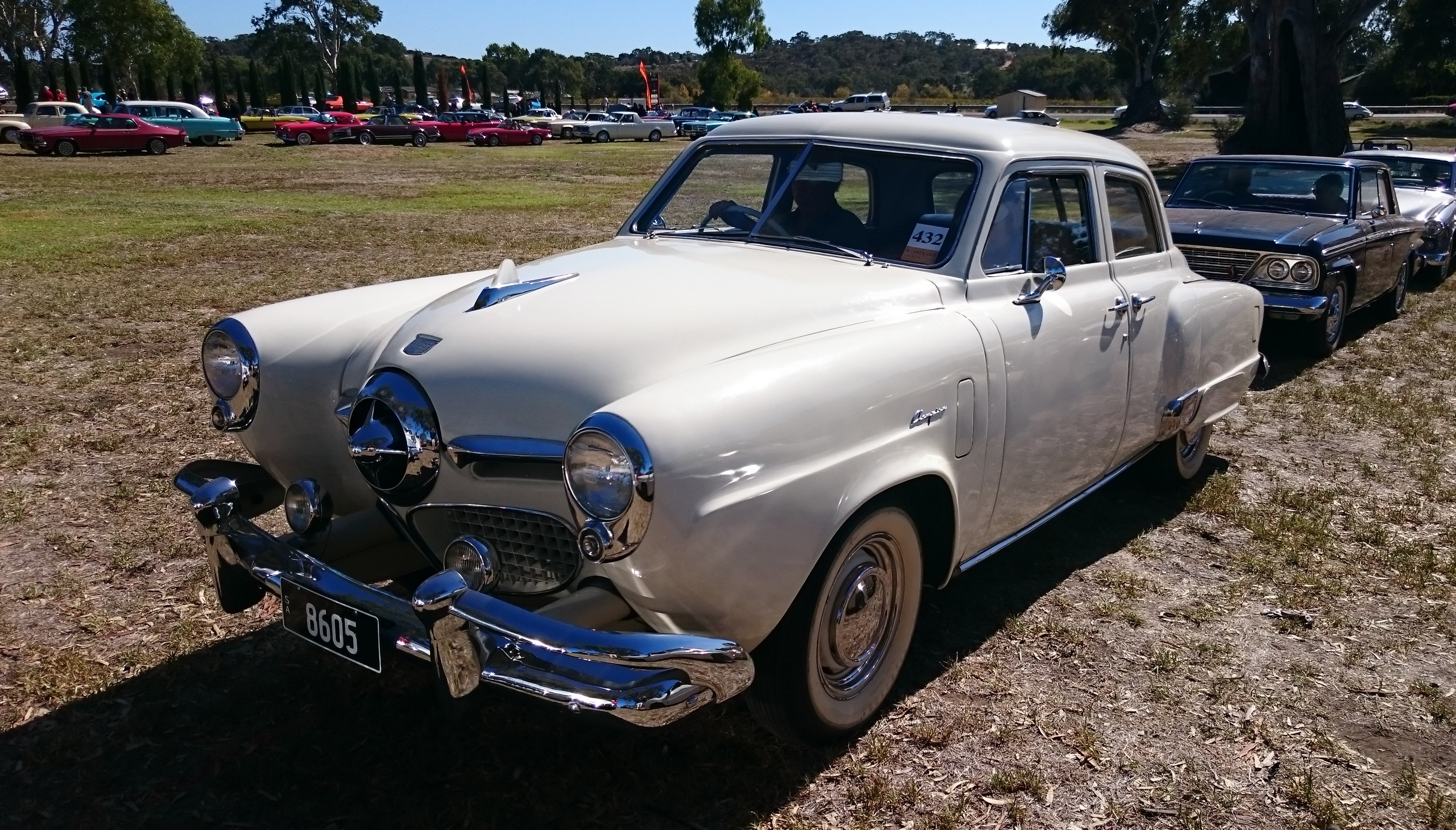
1950 Studebaker Champion 4-Door Sedan

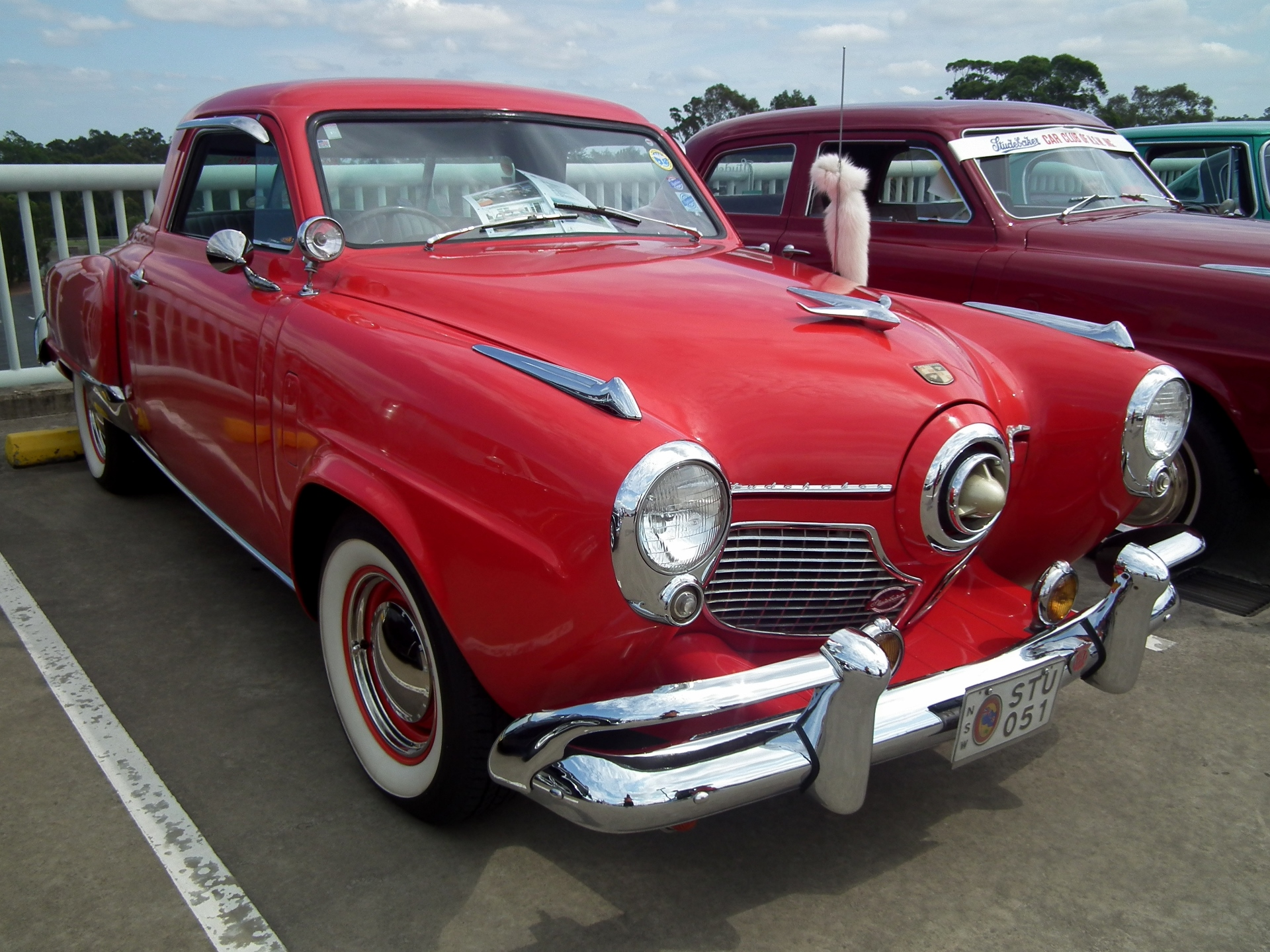
1951 Studebaker Champion Starlight coupe, front view

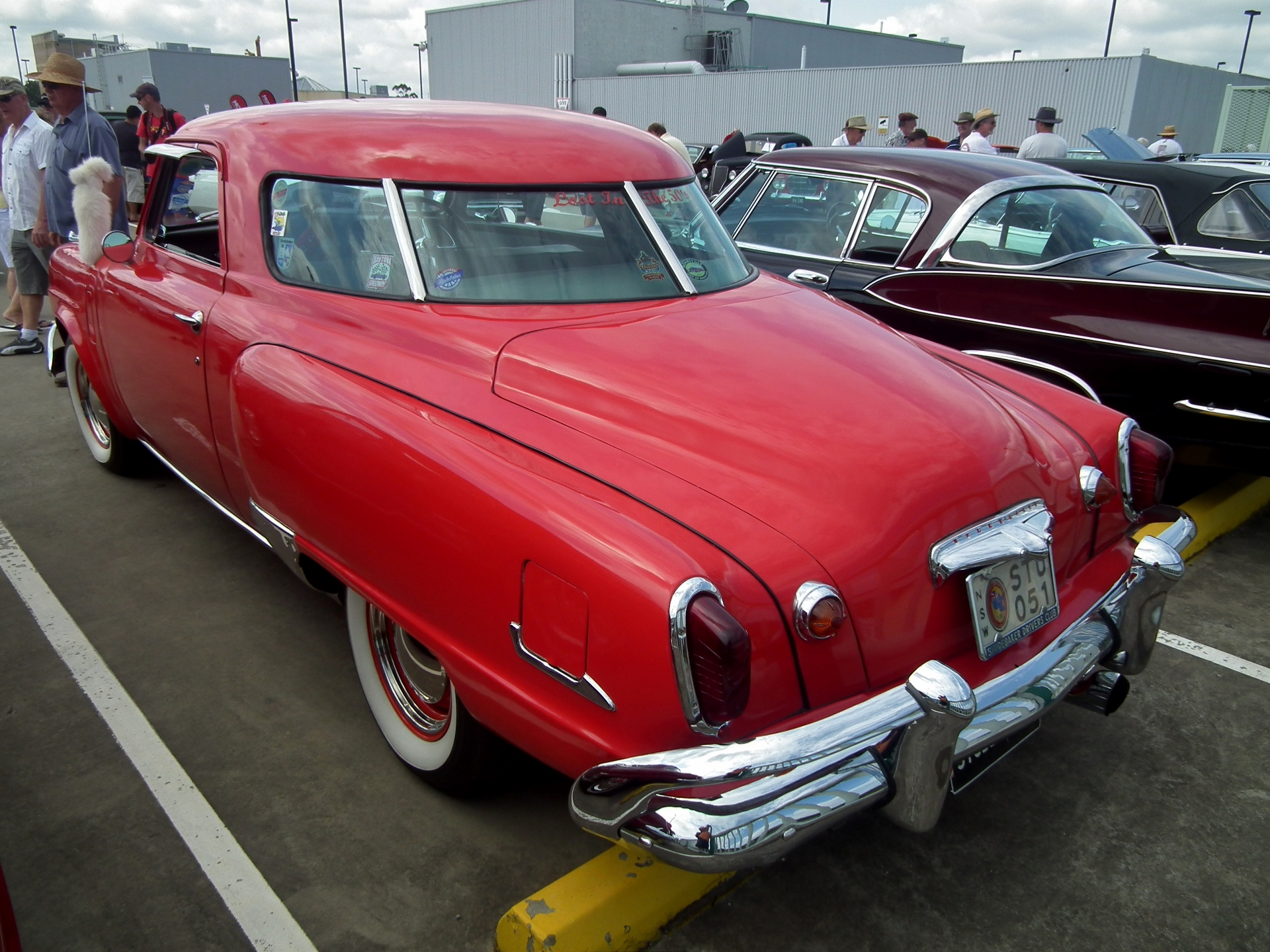
1951 Studebaker Champion Starlight coupe, back view

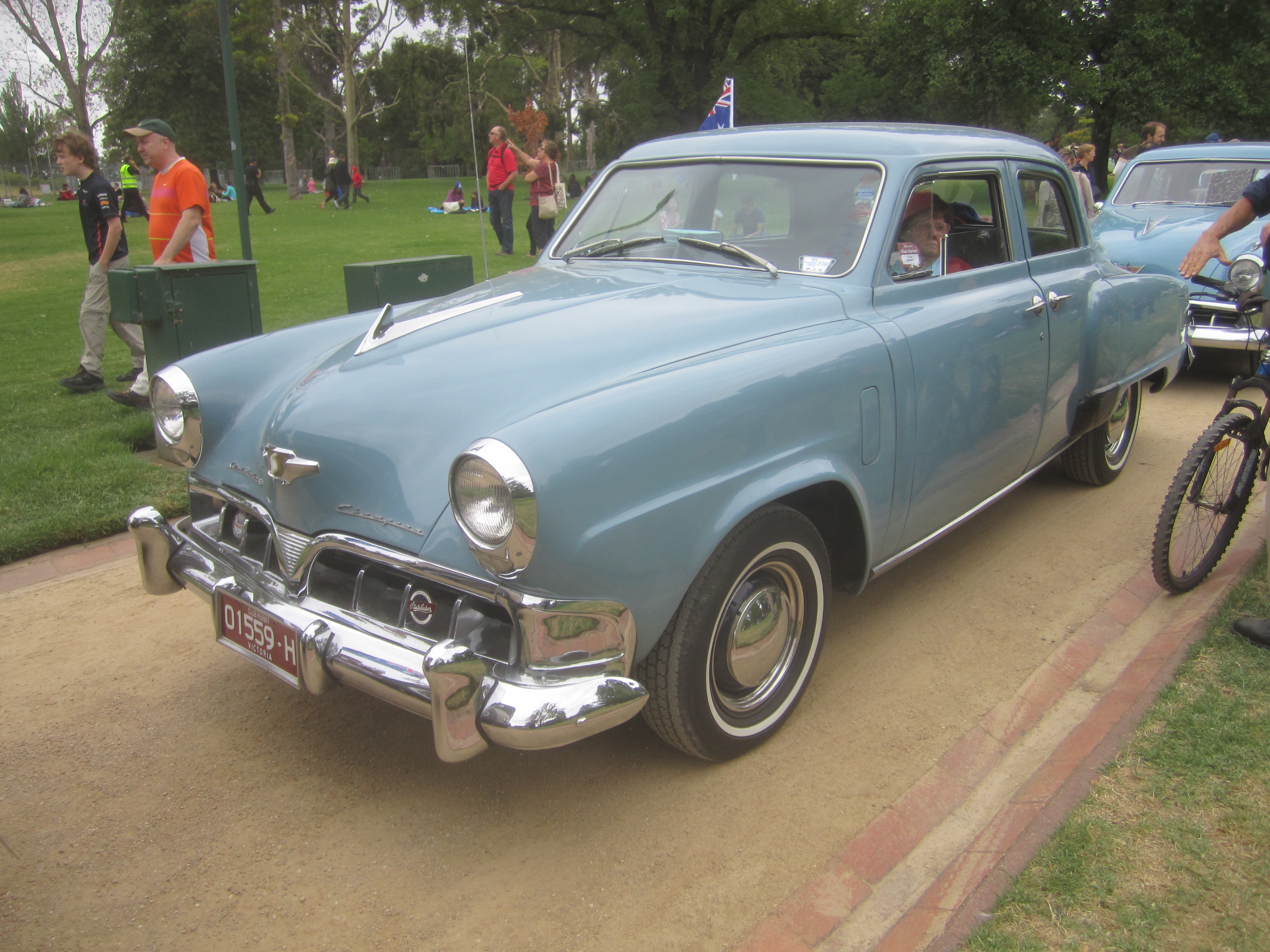
1952 Studebaker Champion 4-Door Sedan

== Fourth generation ==
Fourth generation
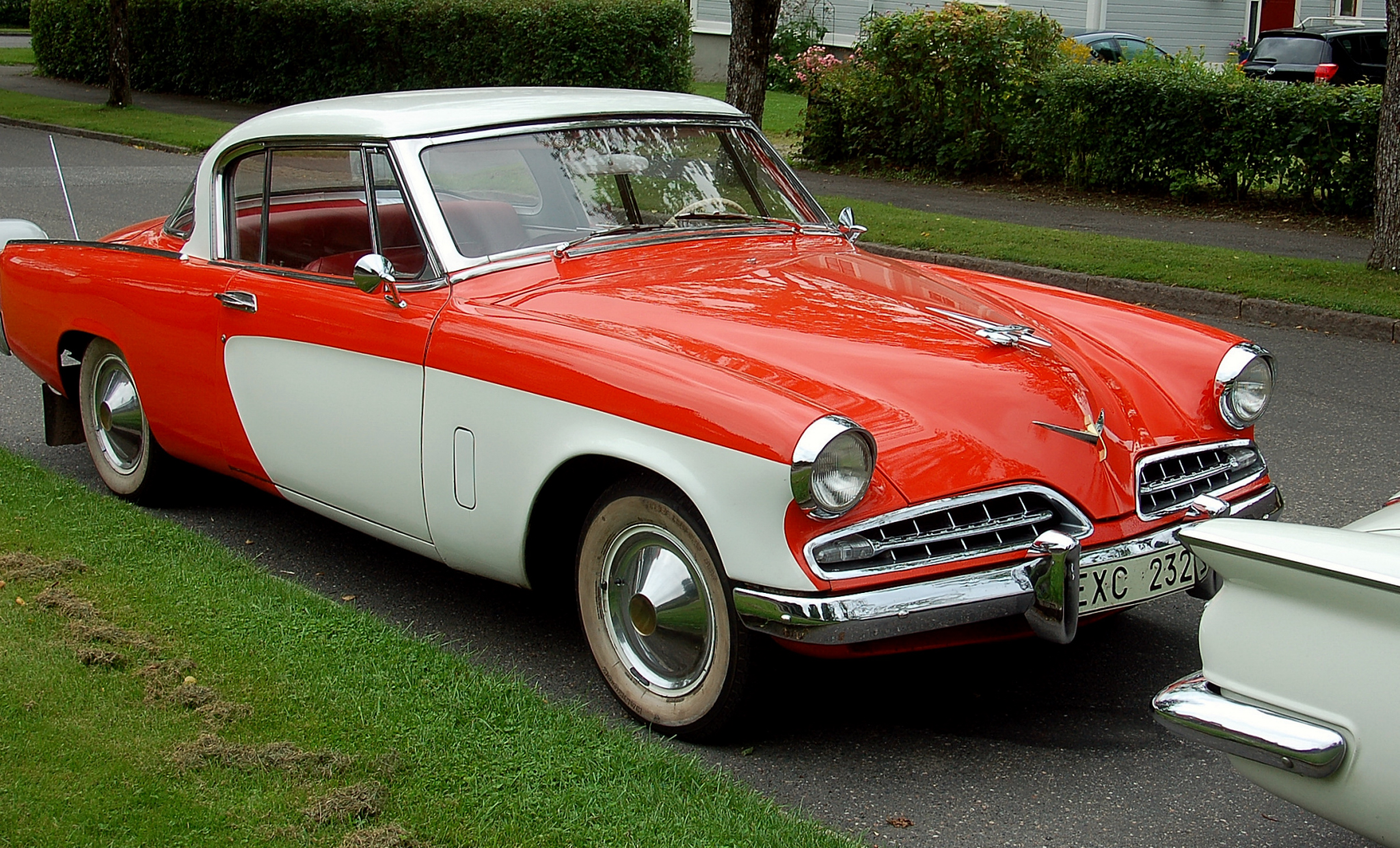
- 1954 Studebaker Champion Regal Starliner hardtop coupe

Overview
- Production: 1953–1956

Body and chassis
- Class: Mid-size car
- Body style: 2-door sedan 4-door sedan 2-door coupe 4-door station wagon 2-door station wagon
- Layout: FR layout

Powertrain
- Engine: 169.6 cu in (2,779 cc) L-head I6; 185.6 cu in (3,041 cc) L-head I6

Dimensions
- Wheelbase: coupes & hardtops: 120.5 in (3,061 mm) sedans: 116.5 in (2,959 mm)
- Length: coupes & hardtops: 202.2 in (5,136 mm) sedans: 198.6 in (5,044 mm)
- Width: coupes & hardtops: 71 in (1,803 mm) sedans: 69.5 in (1,765 mm)

In 1953, Studebaker was redesigned by Robert Bourke from Raymond Loewy's design studio ("the Loewy Coupe" or "Low Boy"). The 2-door coupe with a central pillar was called the Starlight, while the more expensive pillarless hardtop coupe was called the Starliner. In addition to the Loewy Coupes, there was also a 2-door sedan based on a shortened 4-door sedan. The 2-door sedan has a taller profile, and the back side windows in the 2-door sedans are noticeably bigger than the windows in the Loewy Coupes. The Loewy Coupes are substantially more collectible than the 2-door sedans. Although similar, the body pieces on the 2 cars are not interchangeable. The front end of the new Champion was lower than contemporaries and shares an appearance with the Citroen DS.

No convertible was offered in 1953. However, in late 1952 Studebaker produced one prototype of a 1953 Commander convertible to determine whether the model could be profitably mass-produced. The car was based on the 1953 2-door Starliner hardtop. The car was later modified to 1954 model specifications and was occasionally driven around South Bend by engineers. Additional structural reinforcements were needed to reduce body flexure. Even though the car was equipped with the 232 cu in (3.80 L) V8, the added structural weight increased the car's 0–60 mph acceleration time to an unacceptable level. In addition, the company did not have the financial resources to add another body type to the model line. The company's leadership mistakenly thought that the 2-door sedans, 4-door sedans, and 1954 Conestoga wagon (described below) would sell better than the 2-door coupes, so the company's resources were focused on the production of the sedans and the wagon.

When the prototype convertible was no longer needed, engineer E. T. Reynolds ordered the car to be stripped and the body sent to the secret graveyard at the company's proving grounds west of South Bend. A non-engineering employee requested permission to purchase the complete car, rather than see it rot away at the proving grounds with other, earlier prototypes of other cars and trucks. Chief engineer Gene Hardig discussed the request with E. T. Reynolds. They agreed to let the employee purchase the car on the condition that the employee never sell it. In the 1970s, the car was rediscovered behind a South Bend gas station and no longer owned by the former employee. It has been through several owners and paint colors.

In 1954, a new 2-door station wagon called the Conestoga was added to the product line. Power of the L-head inline-six remained unchanged at 85 hp (63 kW), although in 1955 this was replaced by a larger version with 101 hp (75 kW). Also for 1955 the Starlight/Starliner labels were dropped, and a wraparound windshield was introduced. The 1956 Champion sedans received very different bodywork, with pronounced "eyebrows" over the headlights and large tailfins. The coupes received the new Hawk-style bodywork with a centrally placed square grille reminiscent of a period Mercedes-Benz.

The streamlined shape of the Loewy coupes made them popular with land speed racing competitors, both in their stock configuration and modified with chopped tops and other modifications to make them even more streamlined.

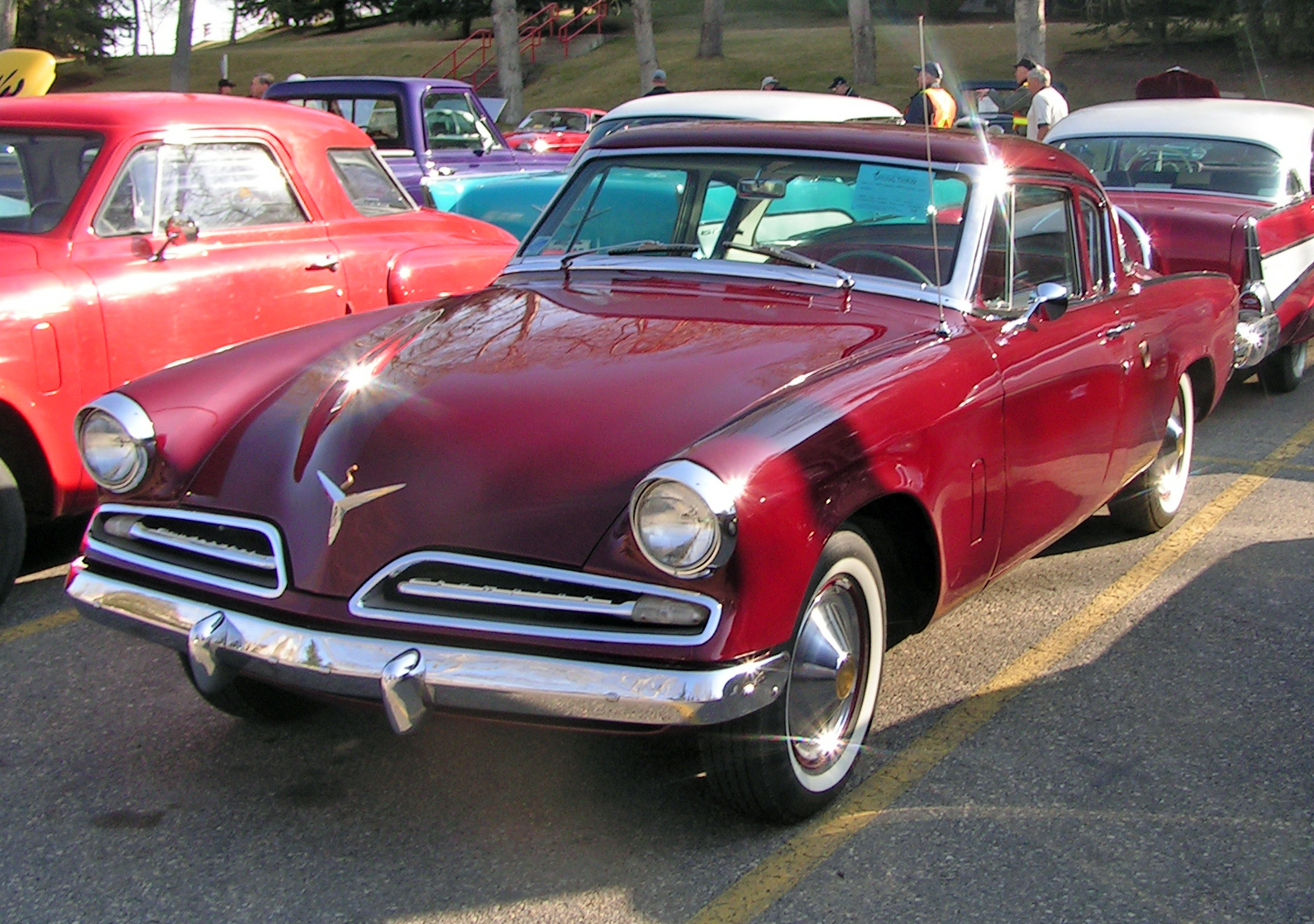
1953 Studebaker Champion Starlight Coupe

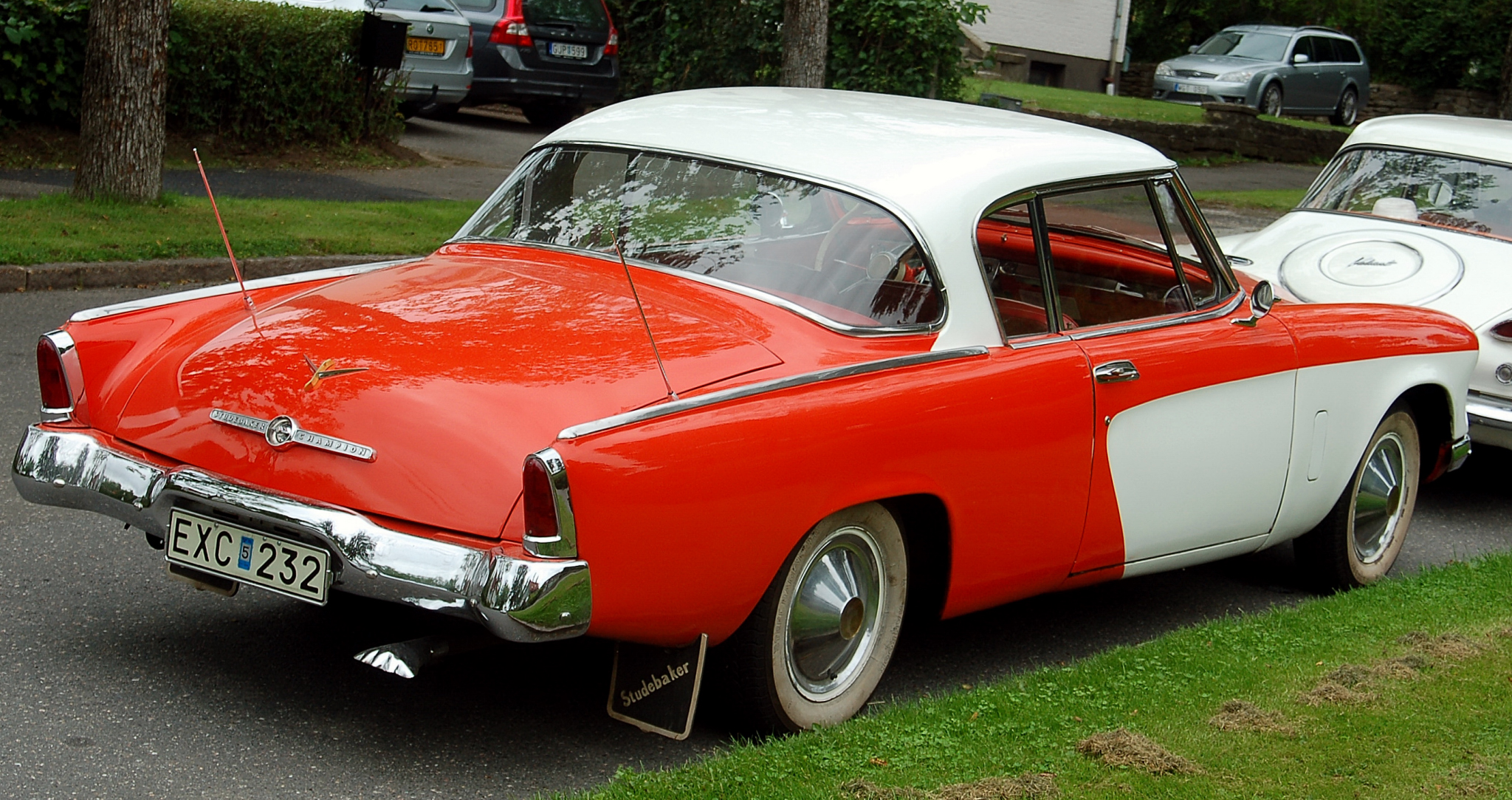
1954 Studebaker Champion Starliner hardtop coupe

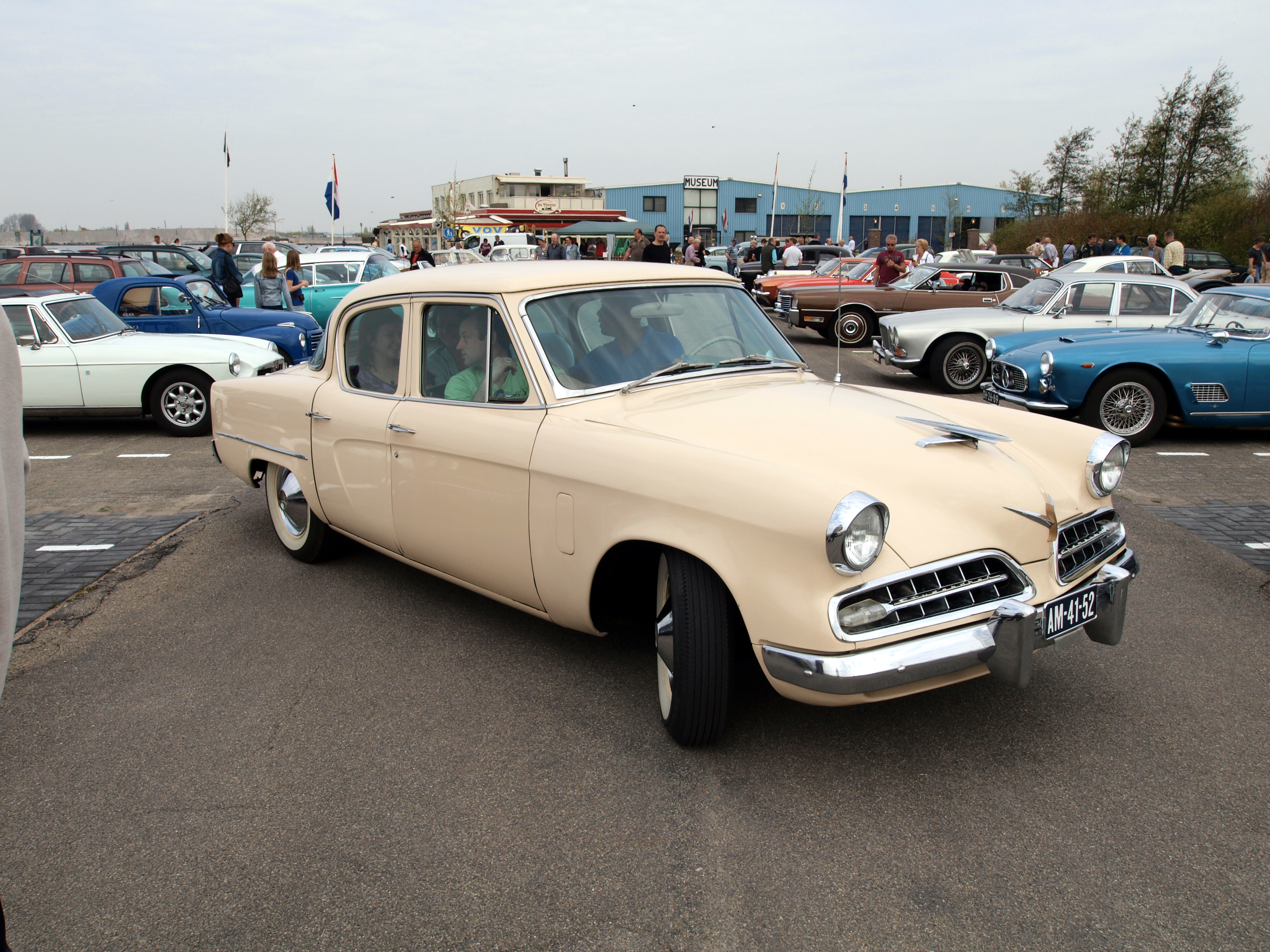
1954 Studebaker Champion Deluxe 4-Door Sedan

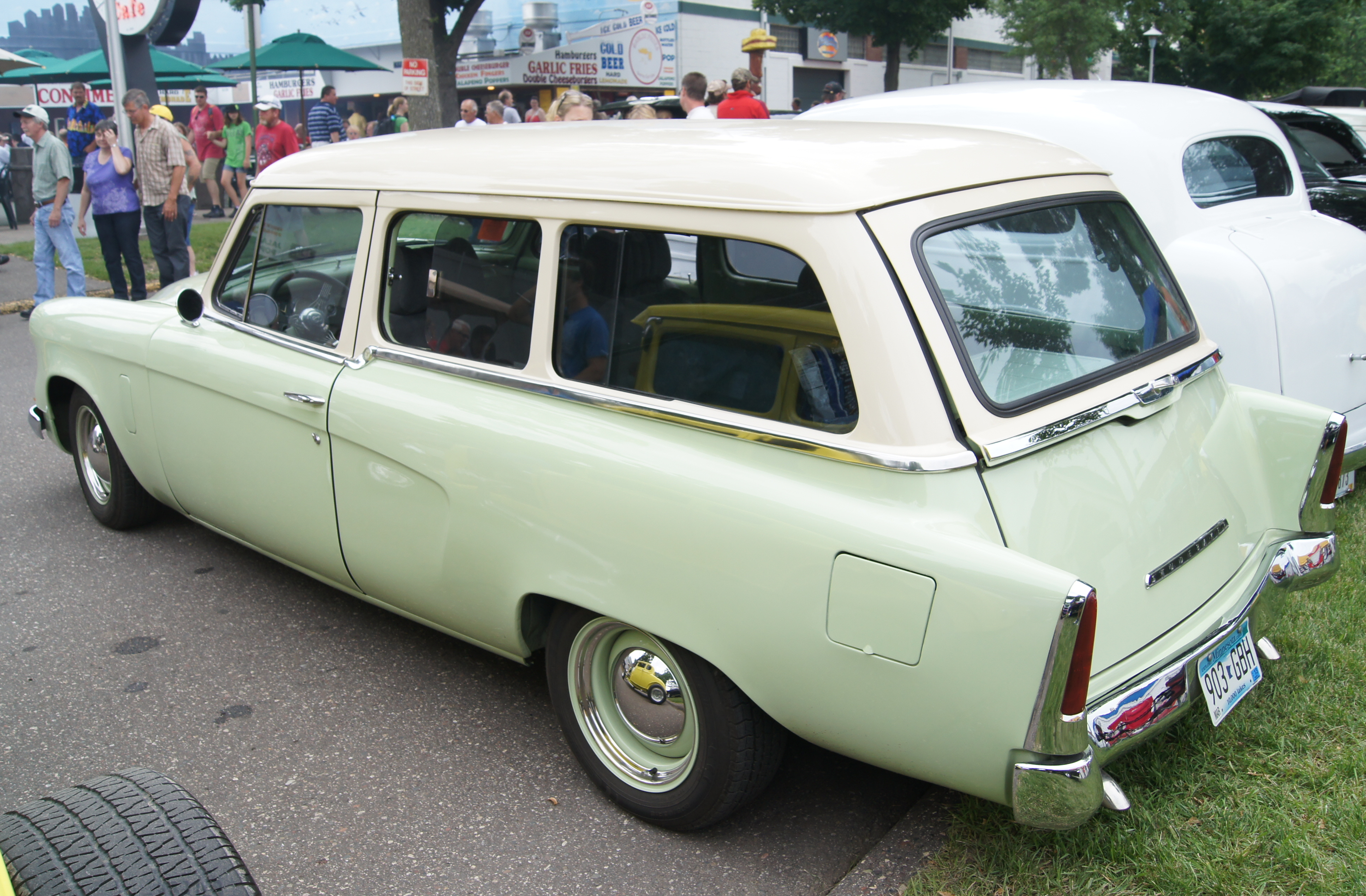
1954 Studebaker Champion Conestoga Station Wagon

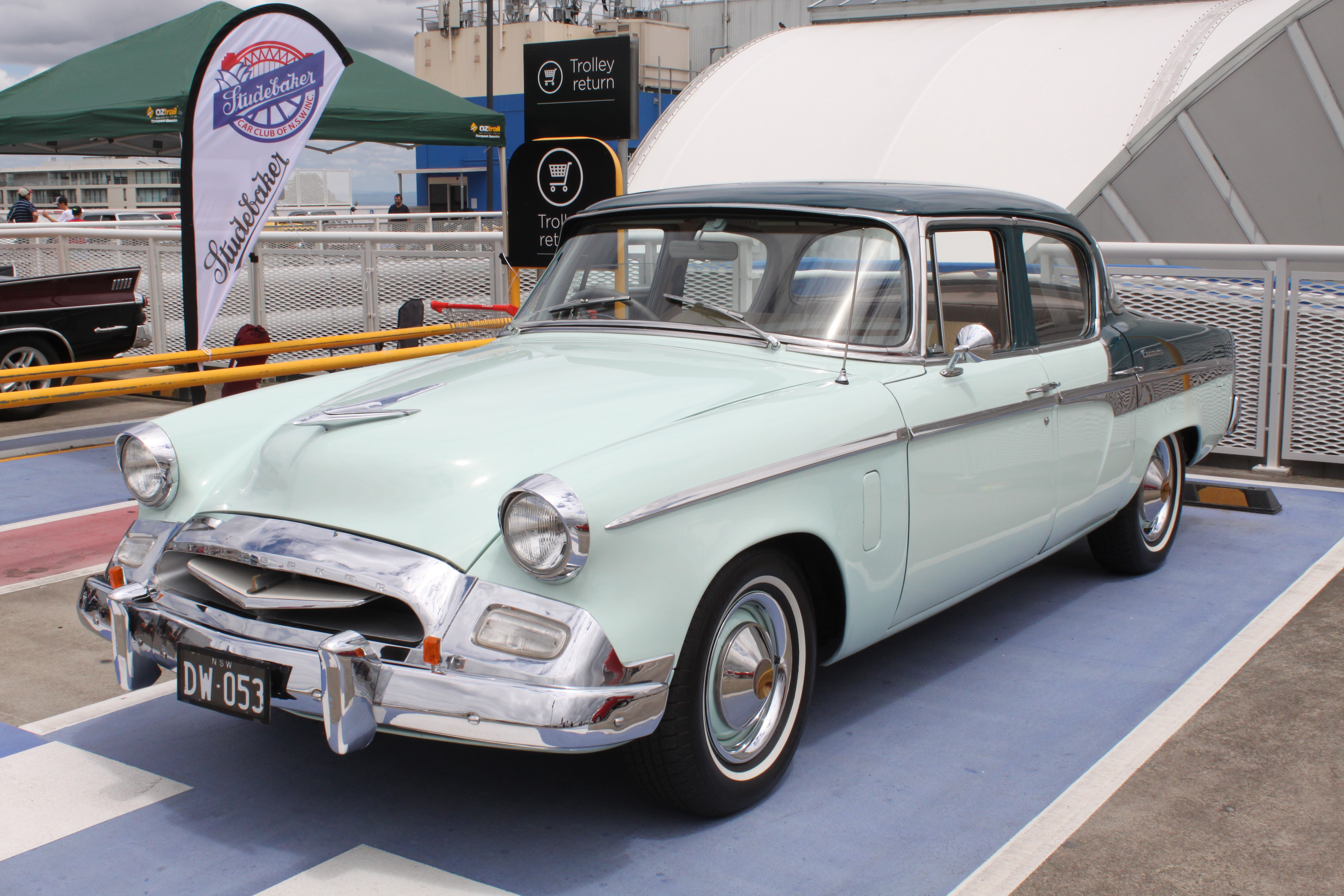
1955 Studebaker Champion Regal 4-door Sedan

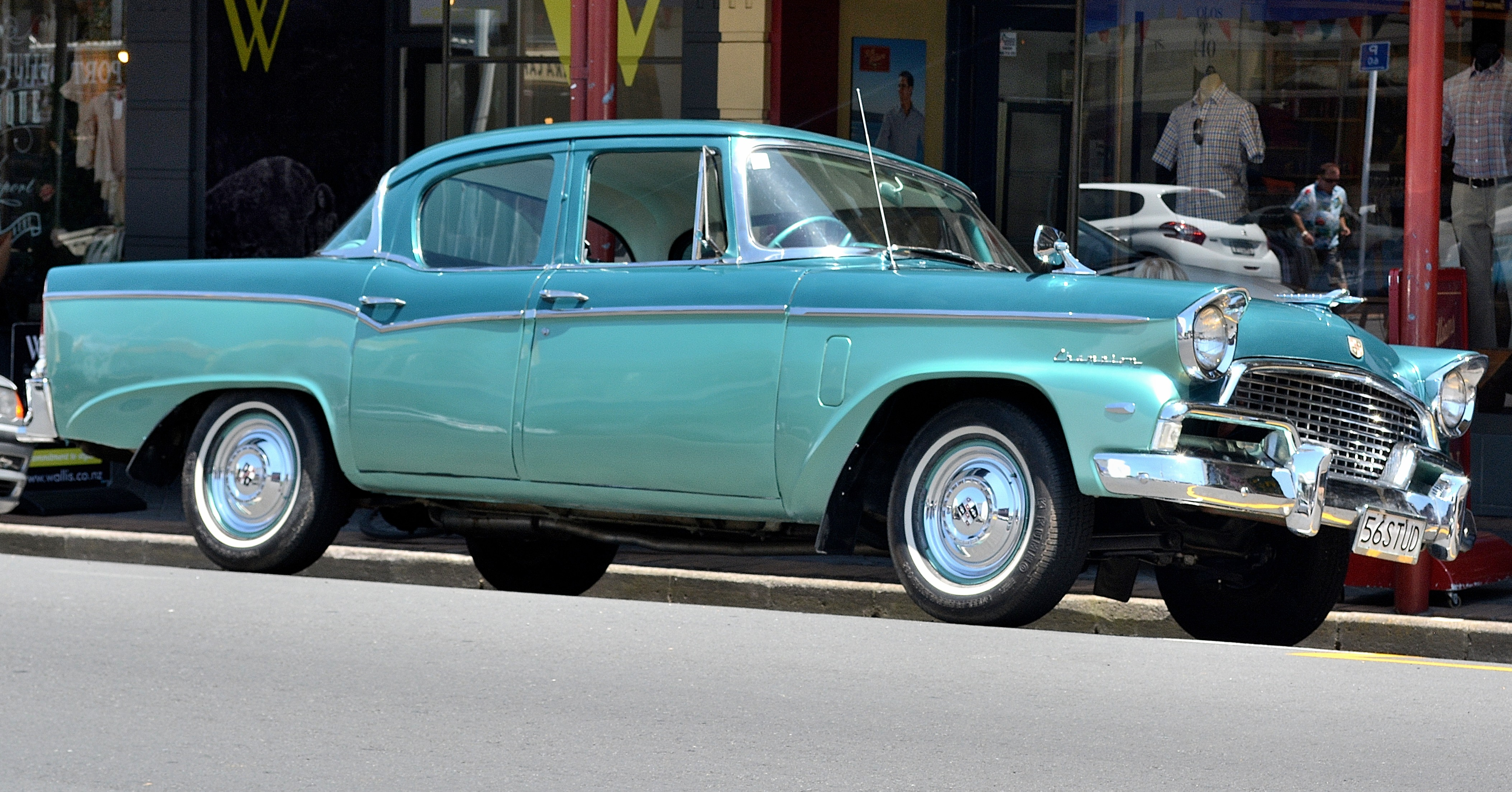
1956 Studebaker Champion 4-door Sedan

== Fifth generation ==
Fifth generation
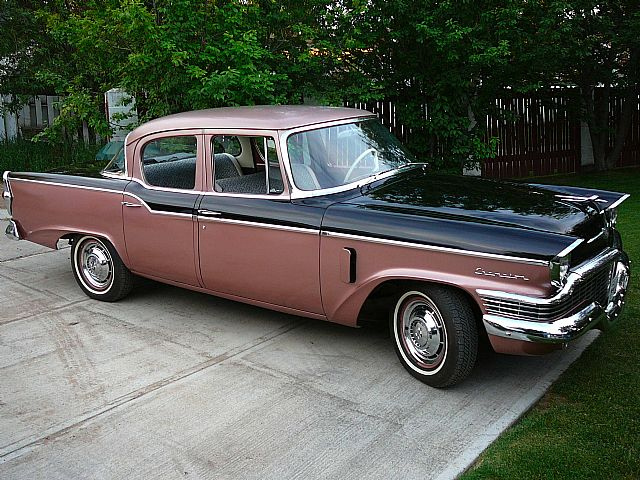
- 1957 Champion 4-door sedan

Overview
- Production: 1957–1958

Body and chassis
- Class: Mid-size car
- Body style: 2-door sedan 4-door sedan 2-door coupe 4-door station wagon 2-door convertible
- Layout: FR layout

Powertrain
- Engine: 185 cu in (3.0 L) L-head I6; 289 cu in (4.7 L) OHV V8

Dimensions
- Wheelbase: sedans & station wagons: 116.5 in (2,959 mm)
- Length: sedans & station wagons: 202.4 in (5,141 mm)
- Width: sedans & station wagons: 75.8 in (1,925 mm)

In 1957, the Champion Scotsman, a stripped-down Champion, was introduced in an attempt to compete with the “Big Three” (General Motors, Ford, and Chrysler) as well as Nash in the low-price field. Shortly after its introduction, the model was renamed Studebaker Scotsman.

Two engines were available, a 185 cu in (3.0 L) 101 hp (75 kW; 102 PS) "Sweepstakes" L-head I6, or a 289 cu in (4.7 L) 210 hp (157 kW; 213 PS) "Sweepstakes" OHV V8.

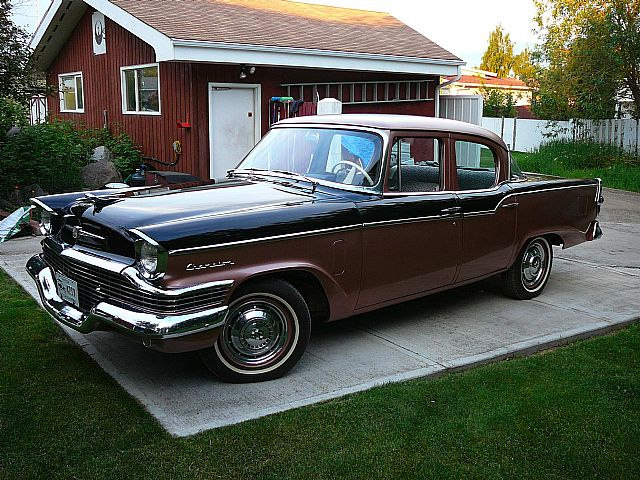
1957 Studebaker Champion DeLuxe 4-Door Sedan

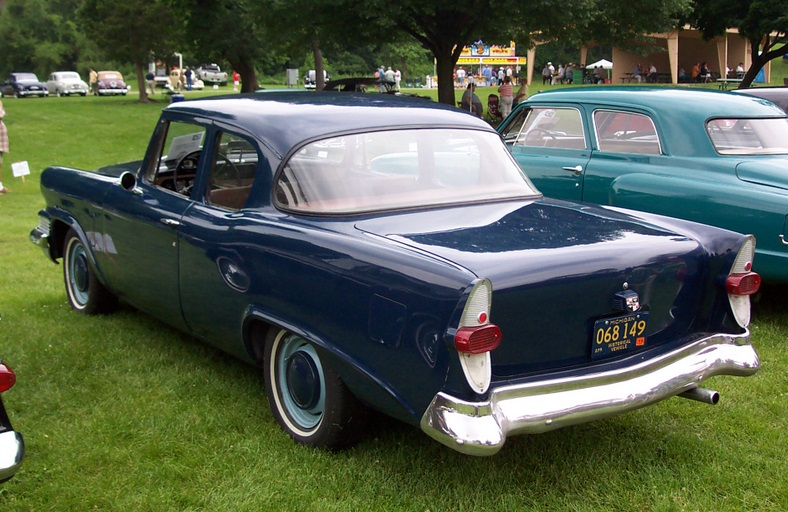
1957 Scotsman by Studebaker

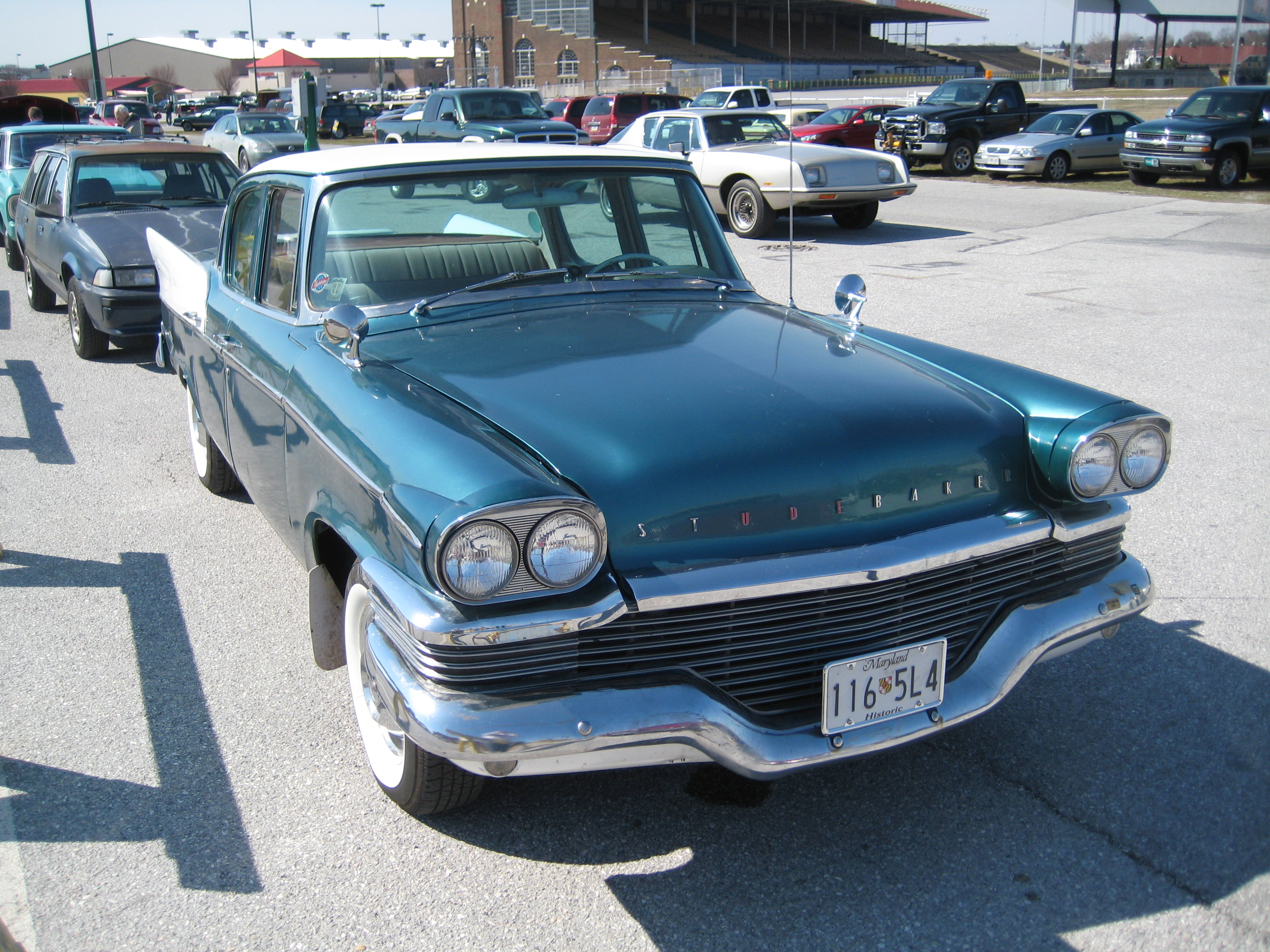
1958 Studebaker Champion 4-Door Sedan

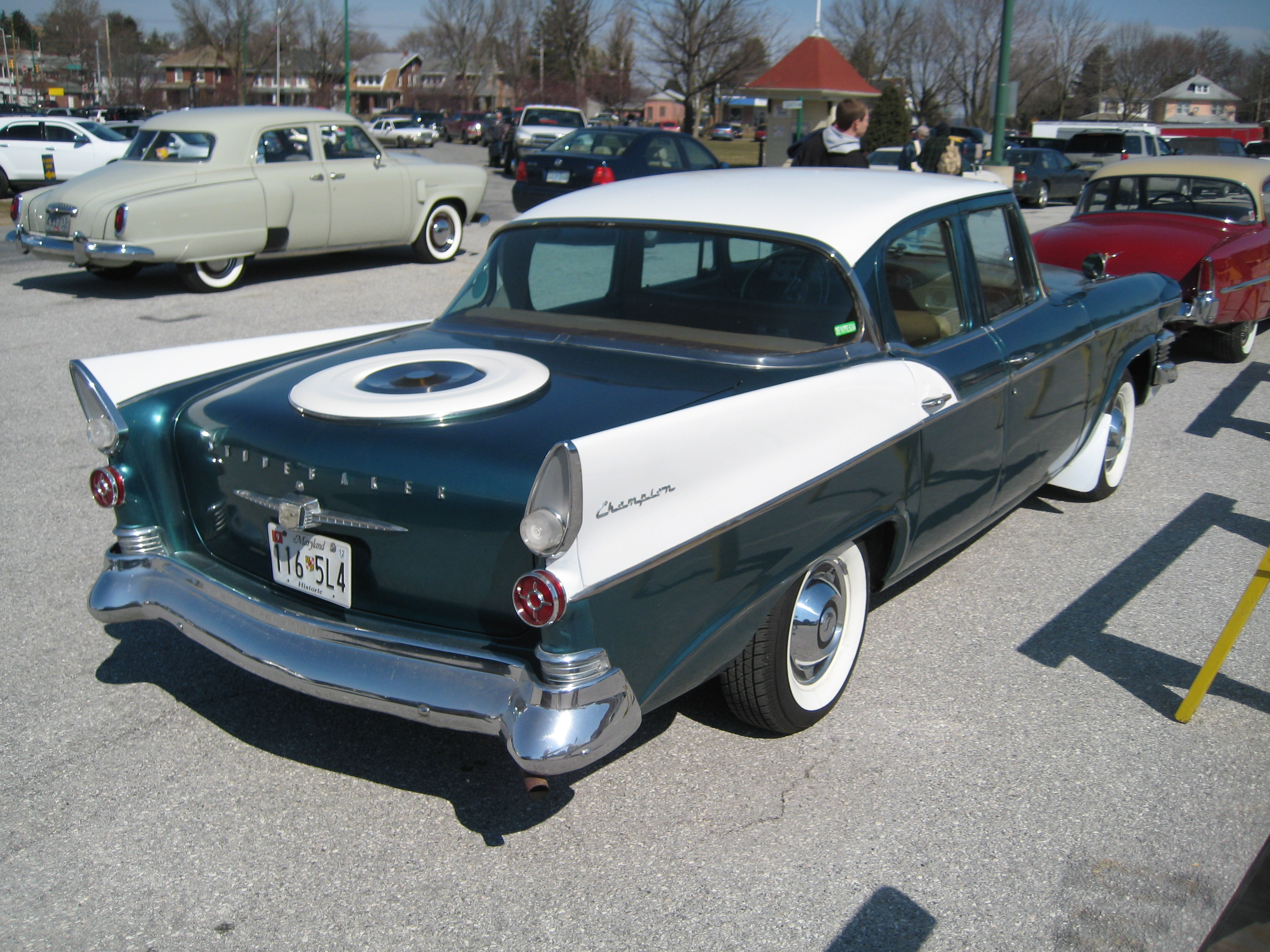
1958 Champion 4-door sedan
