= Studebaker Light Six =

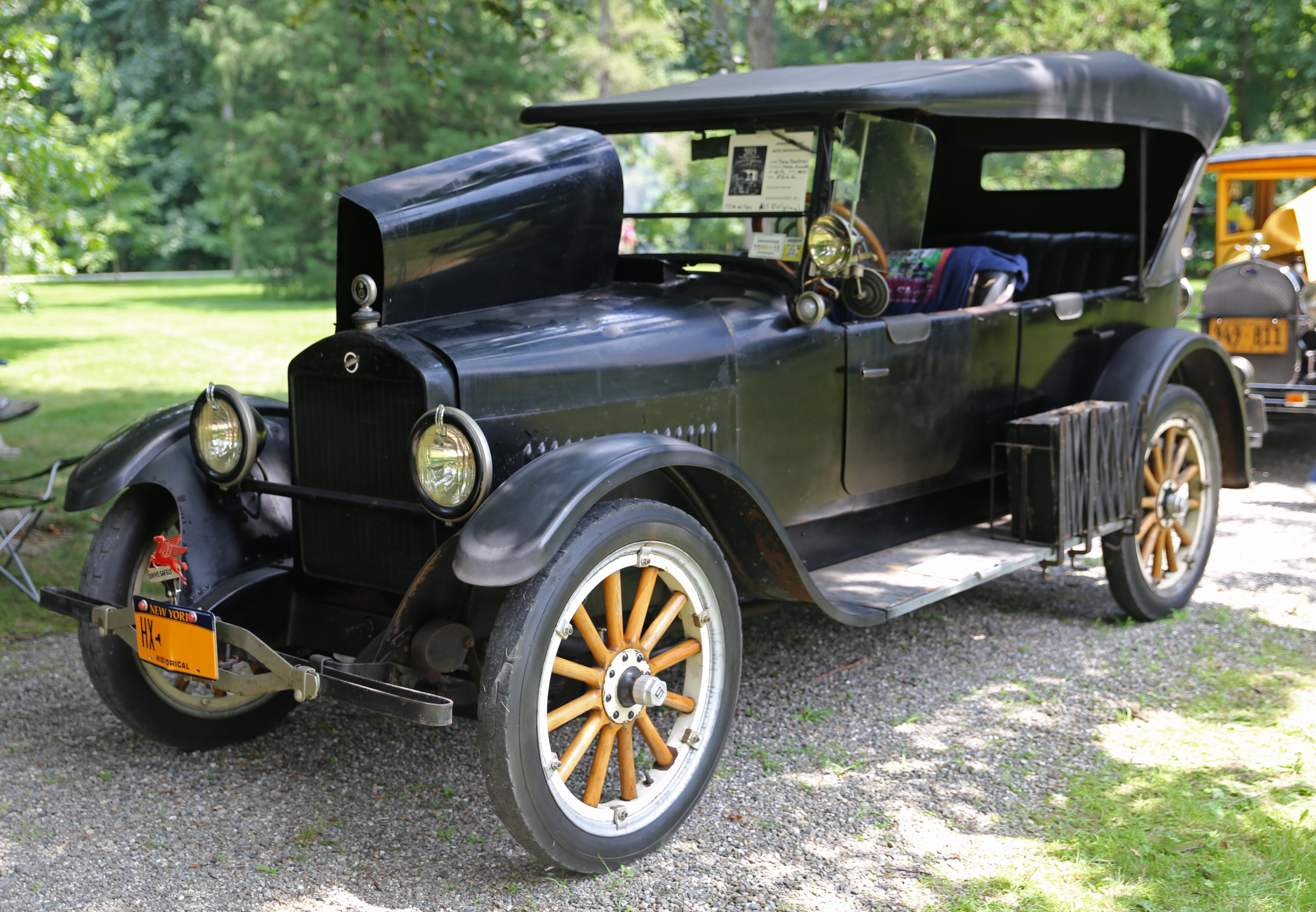
- 1922 Studebaker Light Six Touring Car

Overview
- Manufacturer: Studebaker
- Model years: 1918–1927
- Assembly: Studebaker Automotive Plant, South Bend, Indiana, U.S. Shanghai, Republic of China

Body and chassis
- Class: mid-size
- Layout: Front-engine, rear-wheel-drive

Chronology
- Successor: Studebaker Dictator

The Studebaker Light Six is a car built by the Studebaker Corporation of South Bend, Indiana from 1918 to 1927. It shared its wheelbase and standard equipment items with the Studebaker Light Four and was upgraded to the Studebaker Dictator in late 1927.

== Light Six ==
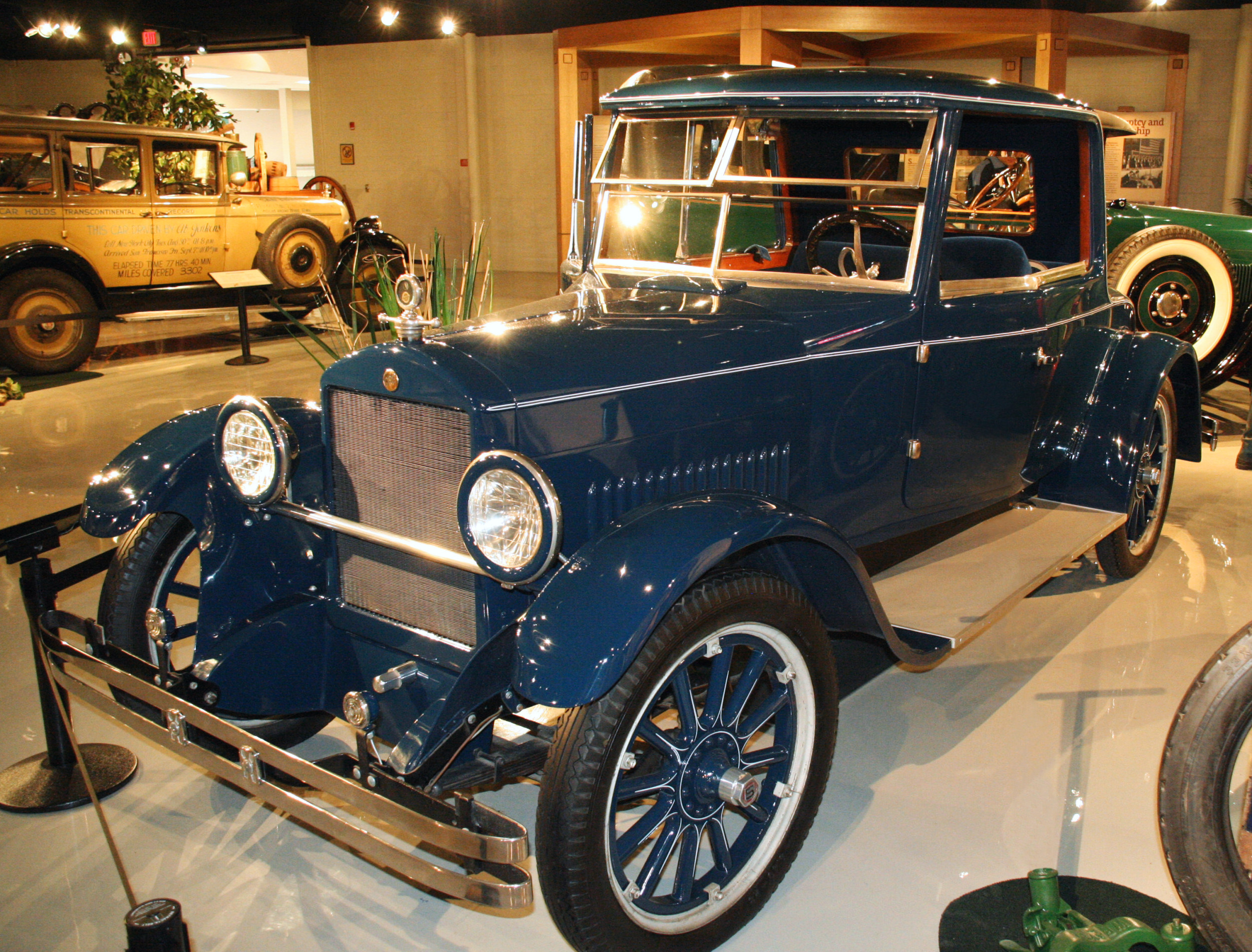
1924 Light Six with custom coachwork

The Light Six originally came out in 1918.

| Year | Engine | HP | Transmission | Wheelbase | Tire Size |
|---|---|---|---|---|---|
| 1918–1921 | 207.1CID L-head 1-bbl. inline Six | 40 | 3-speed manual | 112 in (2,845 mm) | 32" |

== Studebaker Standard Six ==
In August, 1924, the car was renamed the Studebaker Standard Six.

While in production, the Light Six / Standard Six represented Studebaker's least expensive model with a six-cylinder engine, listing a retail price of US$1,045 ($20,571 in today's dollars). The car was available in a full array of body styles throughout its production.

Model EM (Light Six) Engine cylinders: L-head six Displacement: 207.1 cu in Horsepower: 40 hp @ 2,000 rpm • Bore and stroke: 3.125 x 4.5 in • Compression ratio: 4.38:1 • Carburetor: Stromberg 1V one-barrel • Wheelbase: 112 in, wood wheels • Tire: 4 x 31 in • Transmission: Selective-sliding manual three-speed floor gearshift

== Studebaker Standard Six Dictator ==
In 1927, the car was renamed the Studebaker Standard Six Dictator in preparation for the 1928 model year when the car would be henceforth known as the Studebaker Dictator.

== Standard Six Coach specifications (1926 data) ==
- Color - Belgian blue with black upper structure
- Seating capacity – five
- Wheelbase - 113 in (2,900 mm)
- Wheels - wood
- Tires - 31 x 5.25 in balloon
- Service brakes - contracting on rear
- Emergency brake - contracting on drum at rear of transmission
- Engine - six-cylinder, vertical, cast in block, 3-3/8 x 4-1/2 in, head removable, valves on side (L-head), power 27.3 hp
- Lubrication - force-feed (oil pump)
- Crankshaft - four bearings
- Radiator – tubular
- Cooling – water pump
- Starting system – two-unit, electric with storage battery, 6-8 volt
- Wiring – single
- Fuel system – gasoline, vacuum fed
- Clutch – single disc, dry plate
- Transmission – selective-sliding manual on floor, three forward and one reverse gear
- Drive – rear-wheel, spiral bevel differential
- Rear springs – semielliptic
- Rear axle – semifloating
- Steering gear – worm-and-wheel

=== Standard equipment ===
The new-car price included tools, jack, speedometer, ammeter. electric horn, thief-resistant lock, automatic windshield wiper, demountable rims, stop light, spare-tire carrier, rear-view mirror, sun visor, cowl vent, headlight dimmer switch, clock and dome light.

=== Optional equipment ===
Hydraulic four-wheel brakes with disc wheels were available at extra charge.
