= Coke bottle styling =

Automotive body design with a narrow center surrounded by flaring fenders

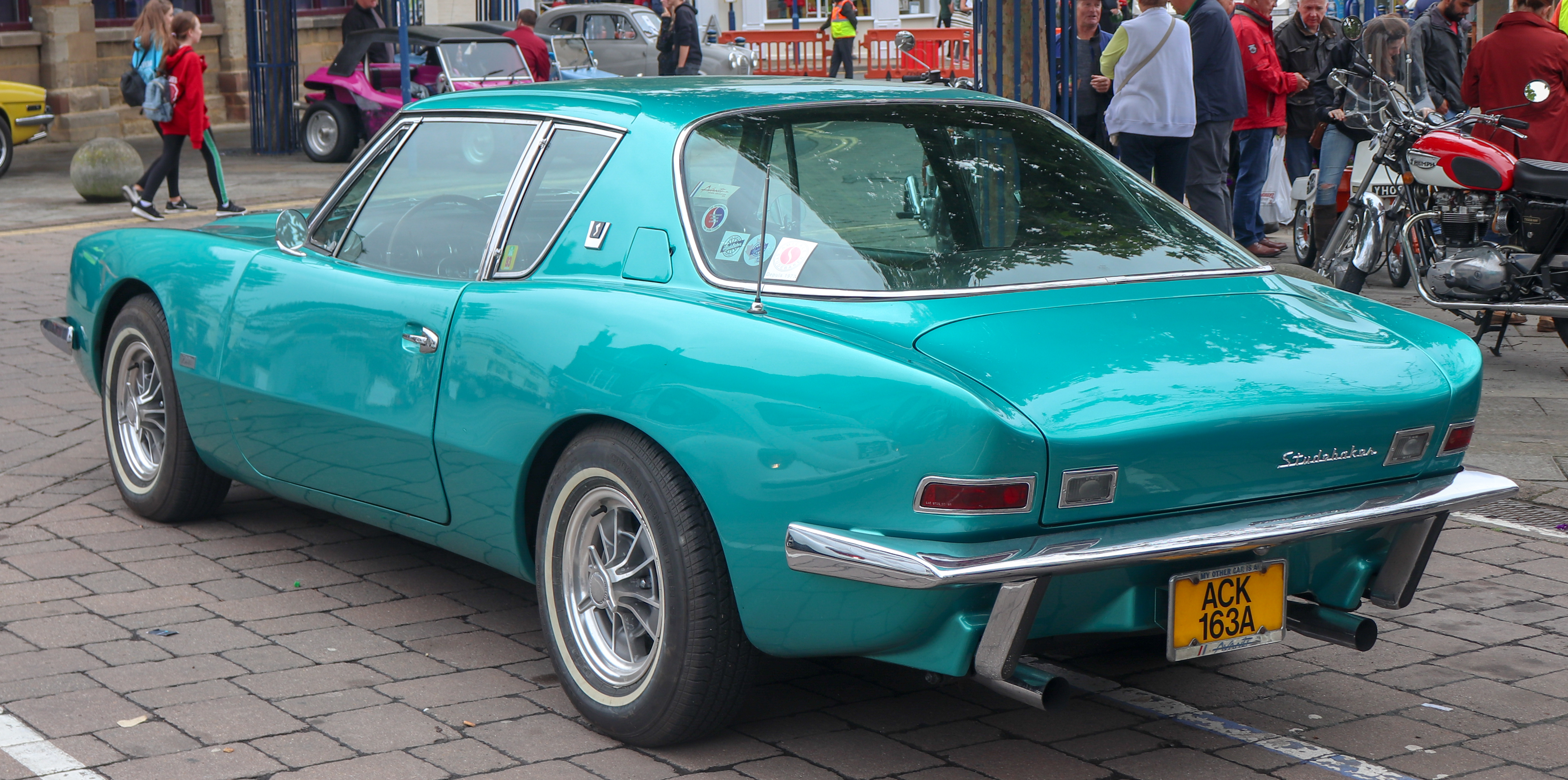
Industrial designer Raymond Loewy pioneered Coke bottle styling in automobiles with the 1962 Studebaker Avanti.

Coke bottle styling is an automotive body design with a narrow center surrounded by flaring fenders. This design element bears a general resemblance to a Coca-Cola classic glass contour bottle design, and was inspired by the tapering middle fuselage of contemporary fighter jets. Industrial designer Raymond Loewy, who in 1955 had re-designed the actual Coke bottle as well, introduced it on the radical 1962 Studebaker Avanti gran turismo.

== Origin ==
The design was pioneered in fighter jets to significantly reduce the sharp drag rise at transonic speed and supersonic speeds. Using this design often results in a pinch-waisted fuselage shape that National Advisory Committee for Aeronautics (NACA) labeled the design principle the "area rule" and variously identified as a coke bottle, wasp waist, or Marilyn Monroe shape (i.e. an hourglass figure). The area rule design technique is most effective between Mach 0.75 and 1.2, or at speeds over 575 mph (925 km/h). The design technique on automobiles provides a visual attraction, but negligible performance improvement.

== Development ==
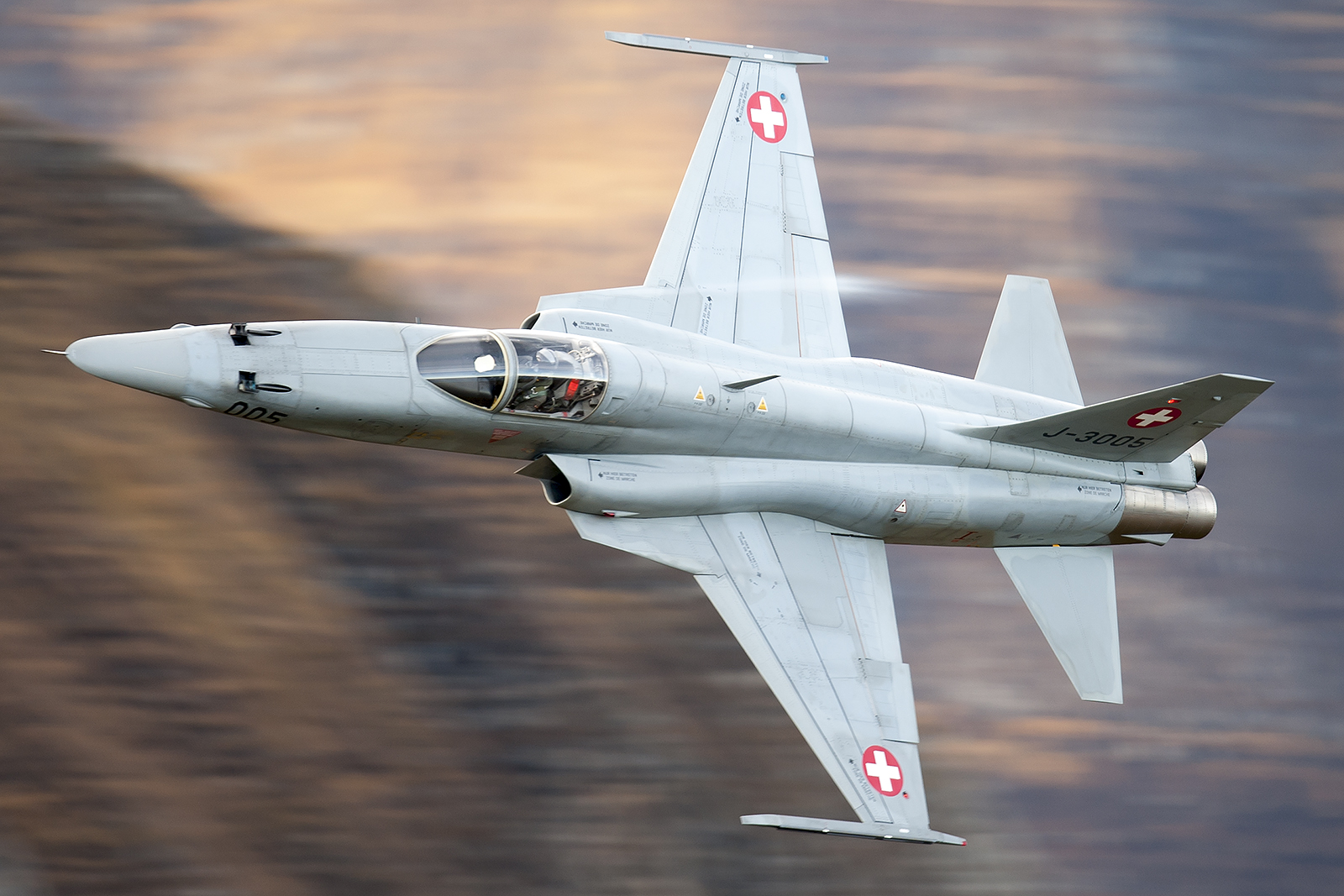
The extremely "wasp-waisted" Coke bottle contour of the Northrop F-5 first flew in 1959 (seen here in an F-5E version).

The exotic shapes of early supersonic fighter jets dramatically influenced automobile stylists. First, the tailfin fad, appeared in the mid-1950s and was on the decline by the early 1960s, then the "Coke bottle" look of severely wasp-waisted high-performance jet fighters, such as the Northrop F-5. The initial result was luxury performance automobiles, such as the 1962 Studebaker Avanti and 1963 Buick Riviera, earned this term "by having more rounded body panels with arcs over the wheelwells, making them resemble bottles of Coca-Cola laid on their sides."

=== United States ===
Studebaker introduced the Raymond Loewy-designed Avanti gran turismo with pronounced Coke bottle look in 1962. The 1962 Pontiac full-size models also "had a subtle horizontal crease about halfway down [the bodyside] and a slight wasp-waist constriction at the doors which swelled out again in the rear quarters" One of the cleanest examples of the "Coke bottle" styling was the 1963 Buick Riviera, a pioneering personal luxury car. Chevrolet first applied the Coke bottle look on Bill Mitchell's 1963 Corvette Sting Ray. The styling of the 1962 through 1968 versions has been described "like a bottle of Coke on wheels" because of the long hood and "powerful wheel arches".

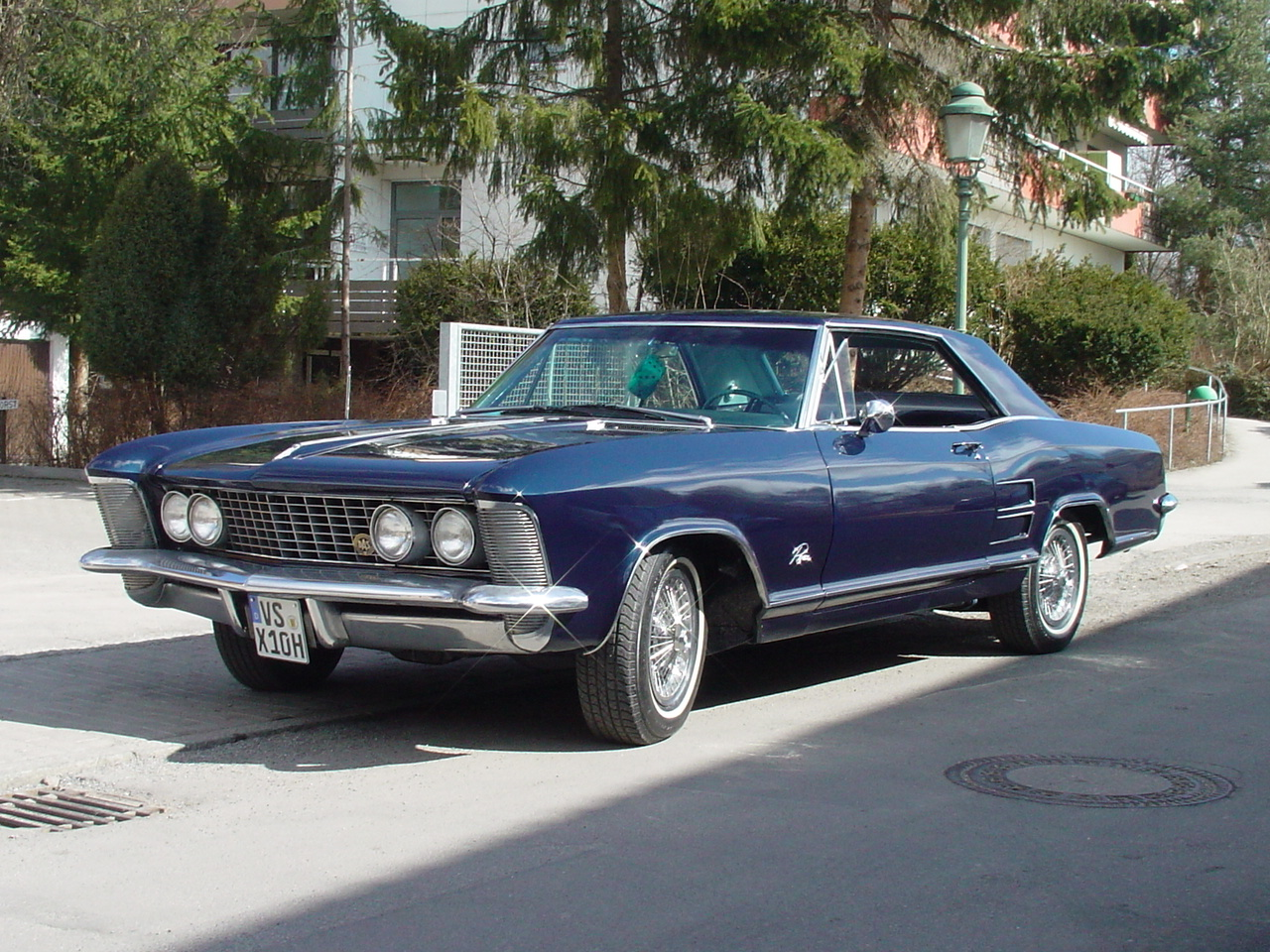
1963 Buick Riviera is regarded as an iconic "Coke bottle" design.

By 1966, the General Motors A-body sedans received a midriff pinch and "hop up" fenders. Intermediates such as the 1968-1970 Dodge Charger and Ford Torino followed suit, as well as compacts such as the Ford Maverick and Plymouth Duster. General Motors also styled their "B" body full-size cars from 1965 to 1968 with this style, which is most prominent on the "fastback" 2-door hardtop models. Chrysler's "interpretation of the Coke-bottle styling treatment to its struggling B-body cars ... [resulted in] ... smooth lines, subtly rounded curves, and near perfect proportions." Notable automobiles with this style include many of the muscle cars during this era, such as the Pontiac GTO, Chevrolet Camaro, and Dodge Charger.

Design "themes" such as the "hop up" fenders became so pervasive across the industry that American Motors' all-new 1967 Rebel was criticized because "viewed from any angle, anyone other than an out-and-out car buff would have trouble distinguishing the Rebel from its GM, Ford, and Chrysler Corp. competition." However, AMC discovered that compared to slab styling with deeply sculpted ridges, "the rounded "Coke-bottle" panels would be easier to make and the dies would last longer — an important cost consideration."

Author Clinton Walker described the archetypal product of Australian suburbia, the muscle car, with its "Coke bottle hip bump but the midriff of a go-go dancer?" According to automotive historian Darwin Holmstrom, Chevrolet "took it to its illogical extreme with the 1968 Corvette, though that car more closely resembled a prosthetic phallus than a Coke bottle".

By the late-1970s and early-1980s, cars like the Ford Fairmont and Chrysler K-cars moved towards straight lines. The Audi 100 (C3) and Ford Taurus led towards functional aerodynamic styling.

=== International markets ===
This styling "was to be seen right across the marketplace and, before long, around the world". Japanese, European, and Australian automobiles also adopted this style during the latter 1960s and into 1970s.

In Japan, Toyota released the curvaceous limited production Toyota 2000GT in 1967, characterized by its "flowing design" and "Coke Bottle Shape". Other period Toyota Coke bottle designs include the 1972-1976 Toyota Corona Mark II and the Toyota Celica. Japanese automaker Nissan offered this appearance on the 1970s-era Nissan Cedrics, Nissan Glorias, Nissan Laurels, Nissan Bluebirds, and Nissan Violets. Mitsubishi also adopted this appearance on the 1973 through 1980 Galant and the 1973-1979 Lancer. The smallest car with this style is usually considered to be the 1967 Suzuki Fronte 360, which was less than 3 m (10 ft) long, while the Subaru 360 also used similar styling elements, notably the curvaceous "belt line".

== Examples ==
- AMC Ambassador (1967-1969)
- AMC Javelin (1968-1974)
- Buick Riviera (1963-1965)
- Chevrolet Camaro (1967-1969)
- Chevrolet Corvair (1965–1969)
- Chevrolet Impala (1965–1970)
- Corvette Sting Ray (1963-1967)
- Dodge Charger (1968-1970)
- Studebaker Avanti (1963-1964)

=== Gallery ===
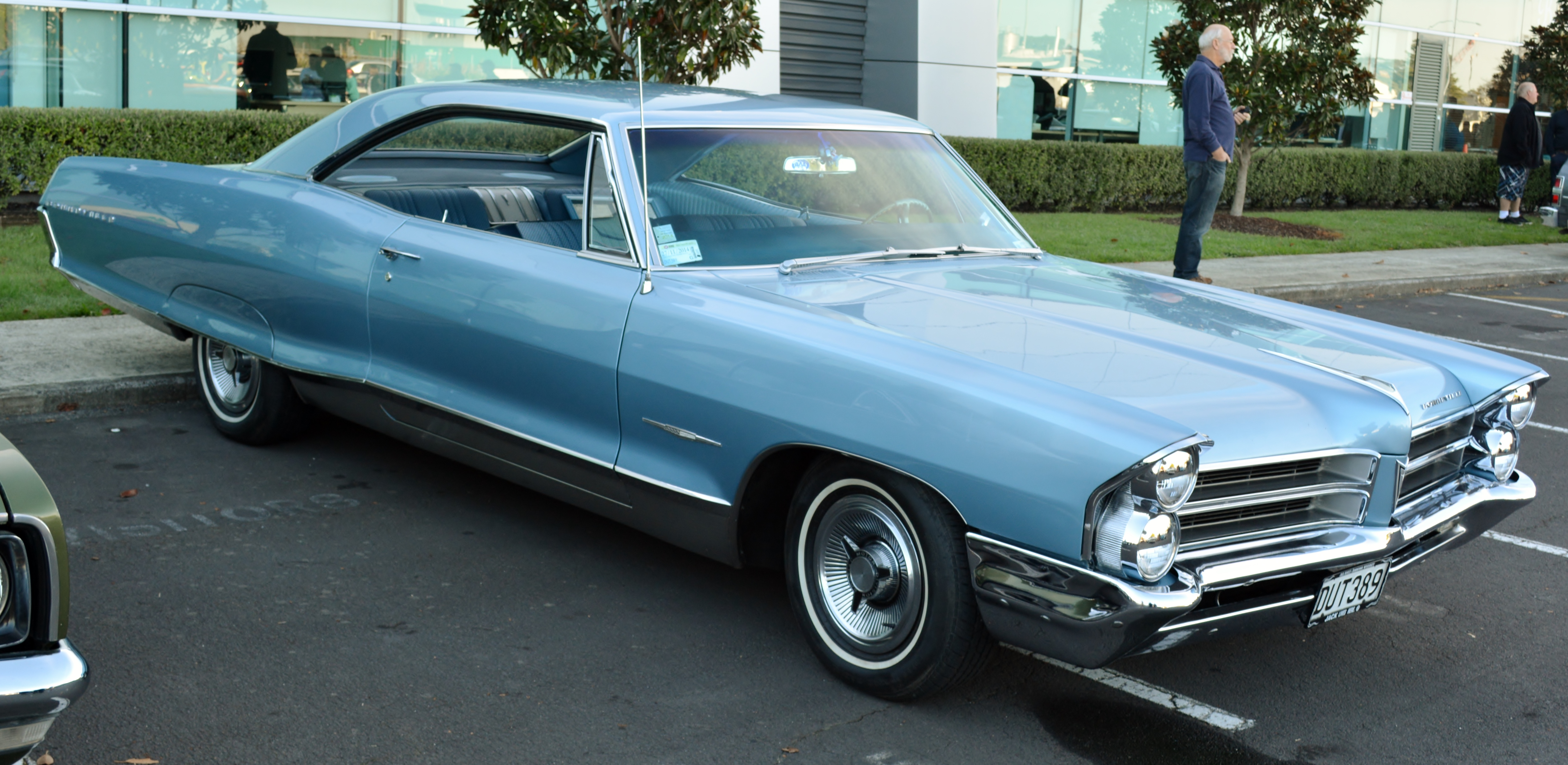
1965 Pontiac Bonneville

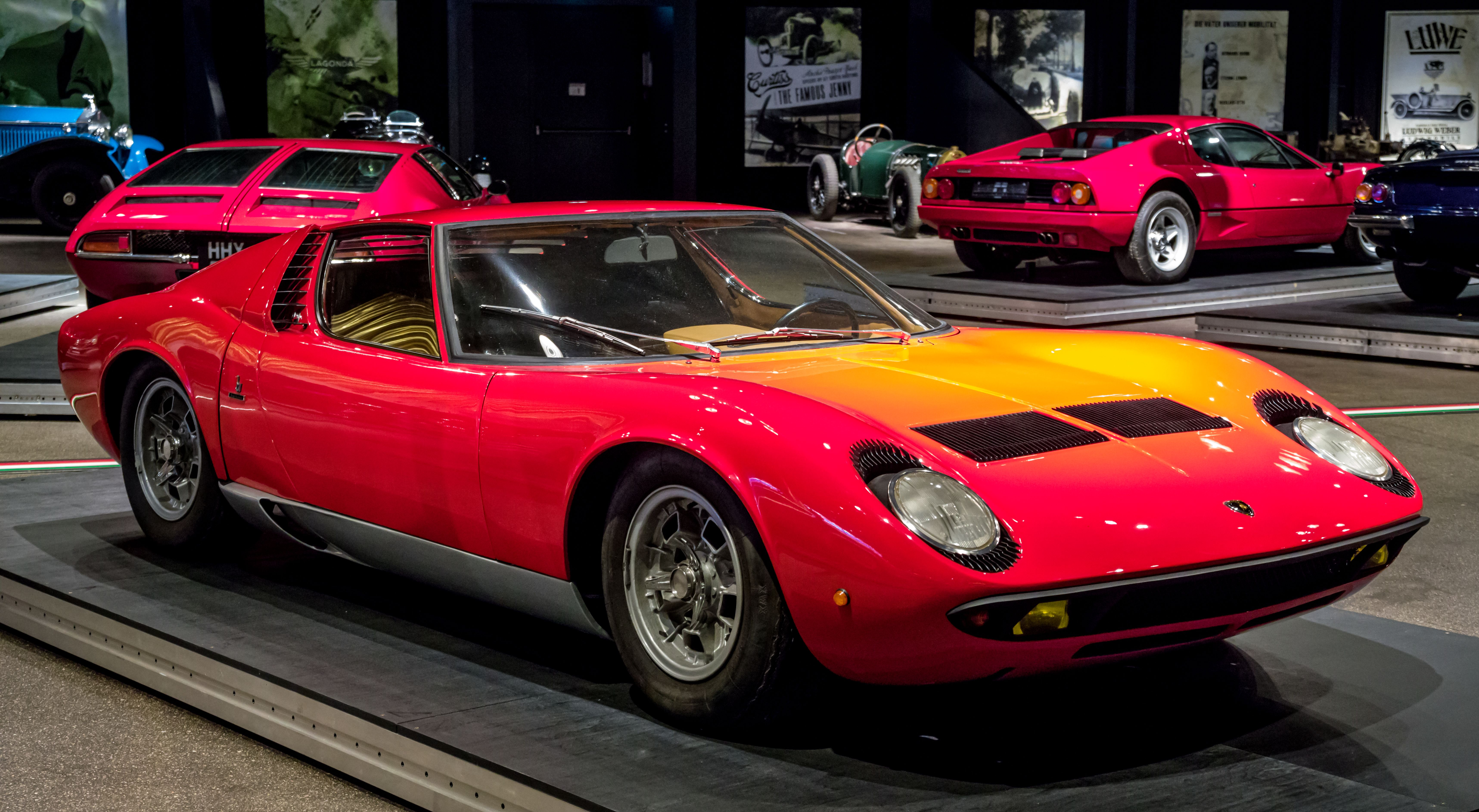
1966 Lamborghini Miura P400

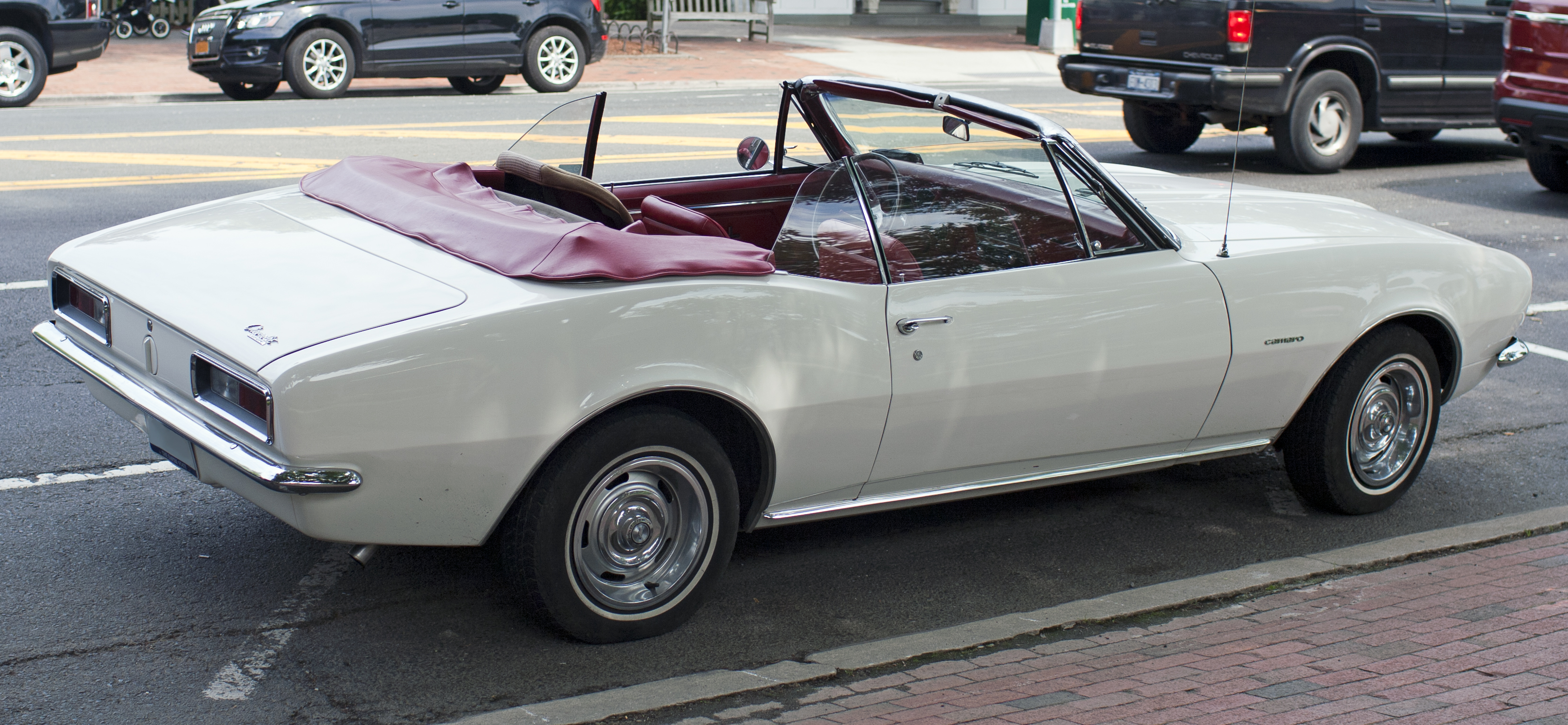
1967 Chevrolet Camaro

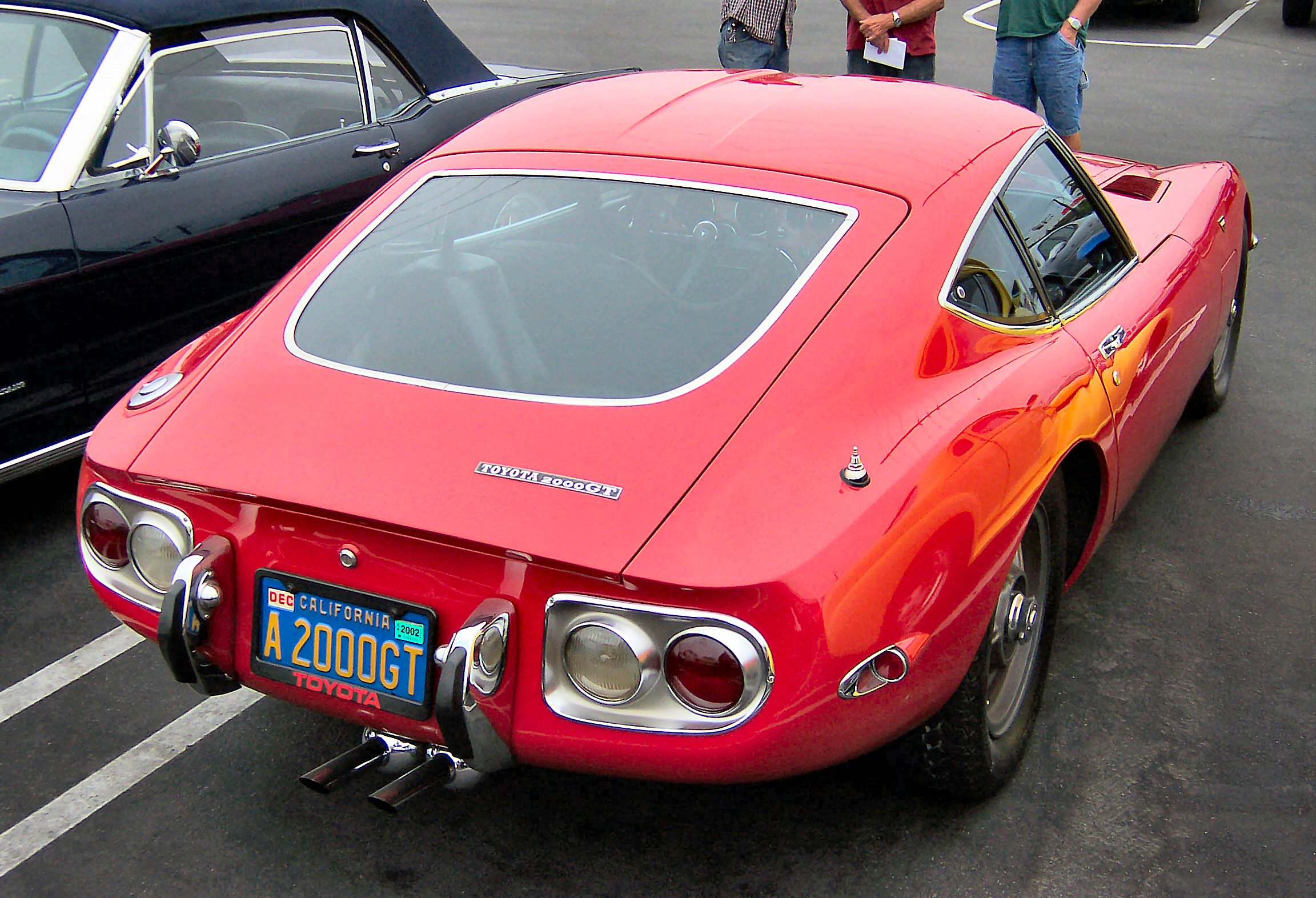
1967-1969 Toyota 2000GT

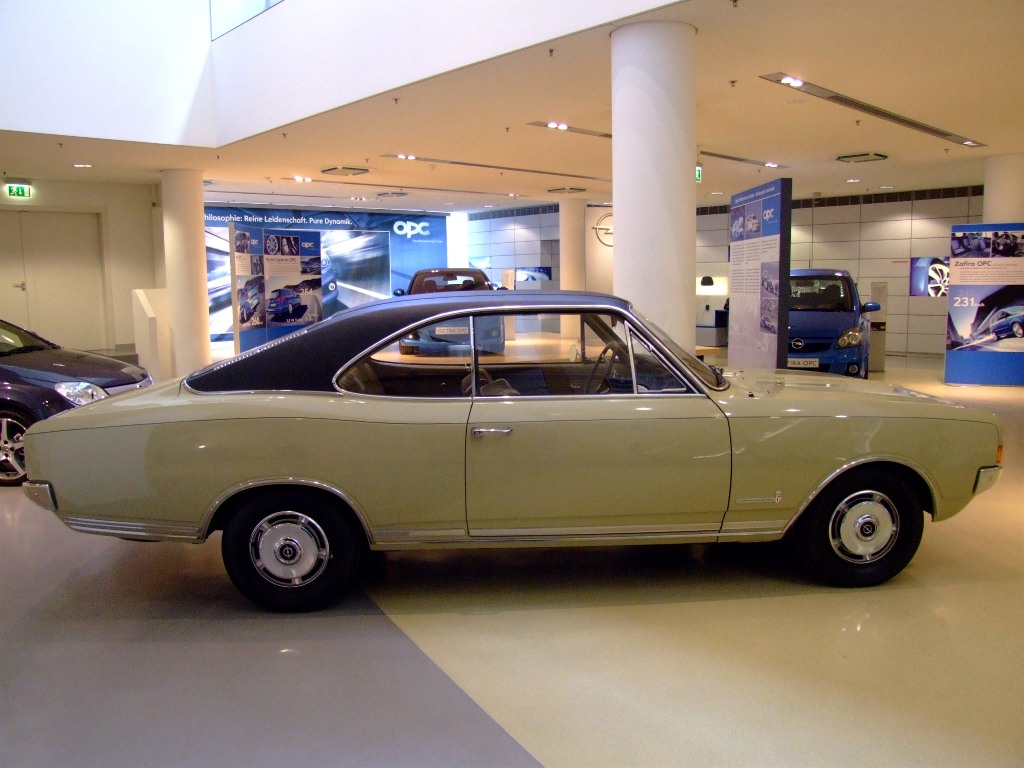
1967-1971 Opel Commodore A

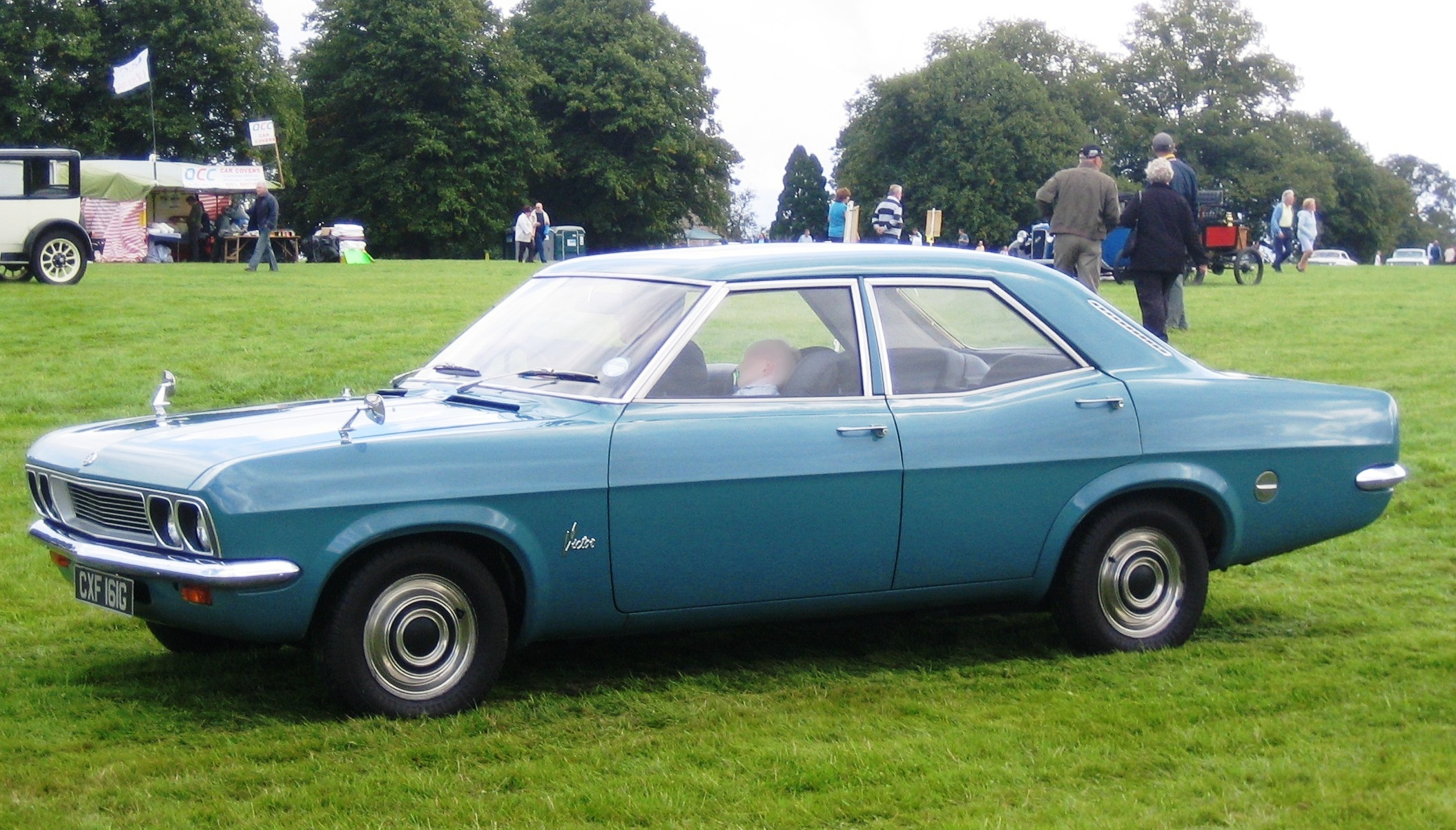
1967-1972 Vauxhall Victor FD

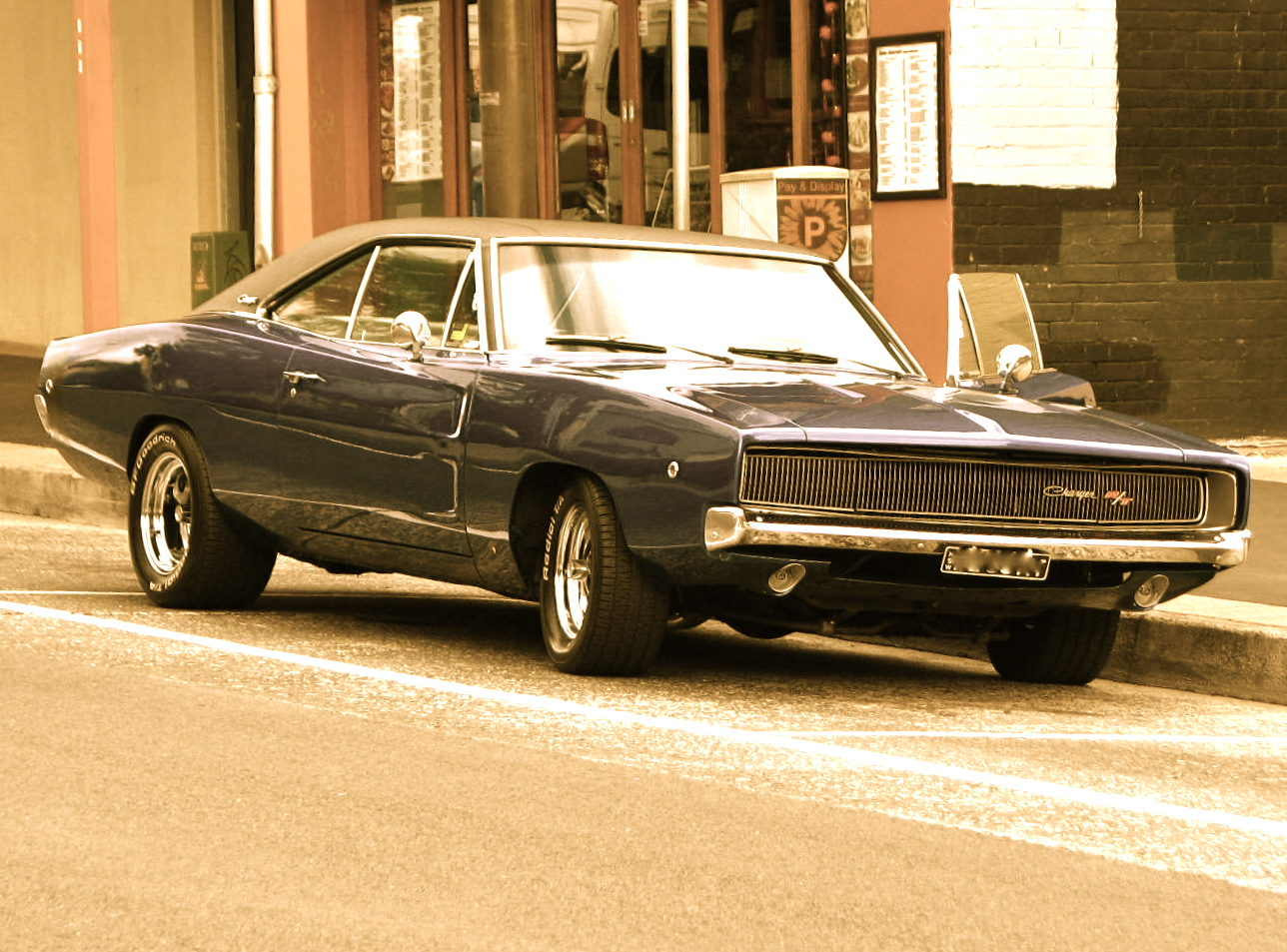
1968 Charger R/T

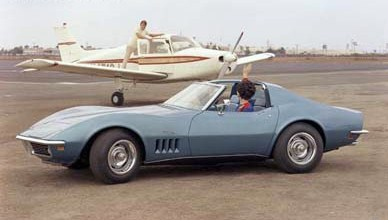
1969 Chevrolet Corvette

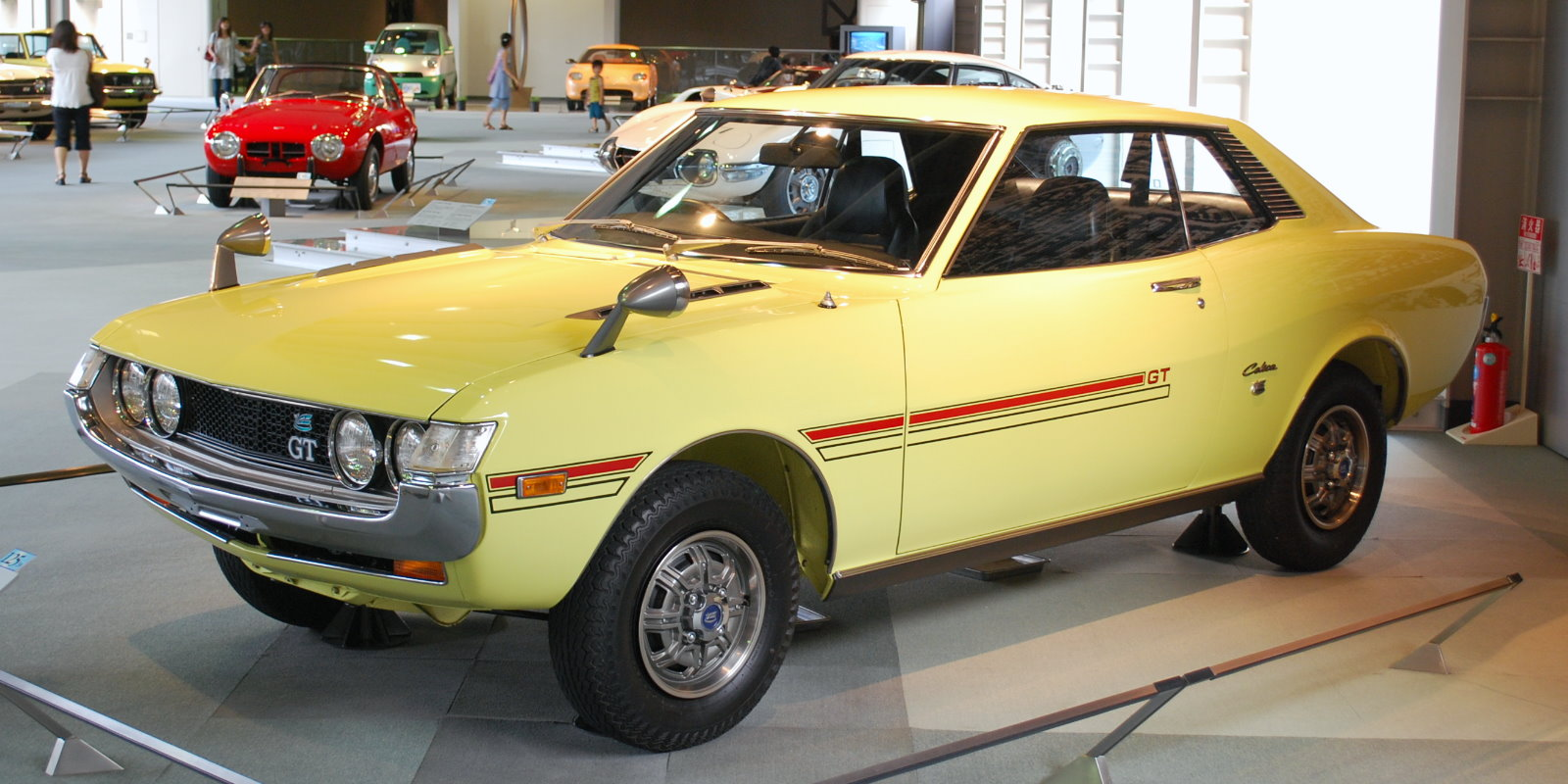
1970 Toyota Celica

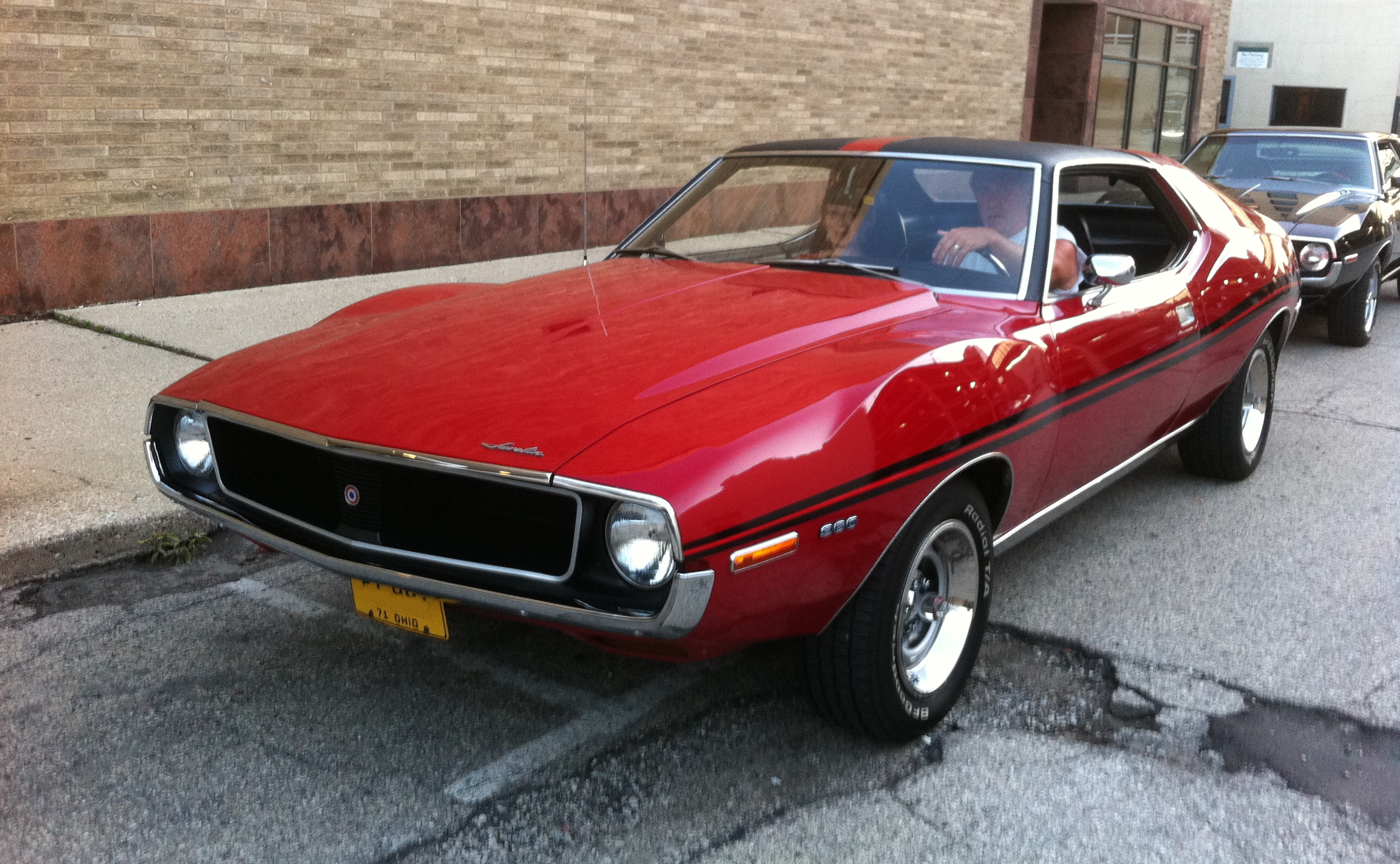
1971 AMC Javelin

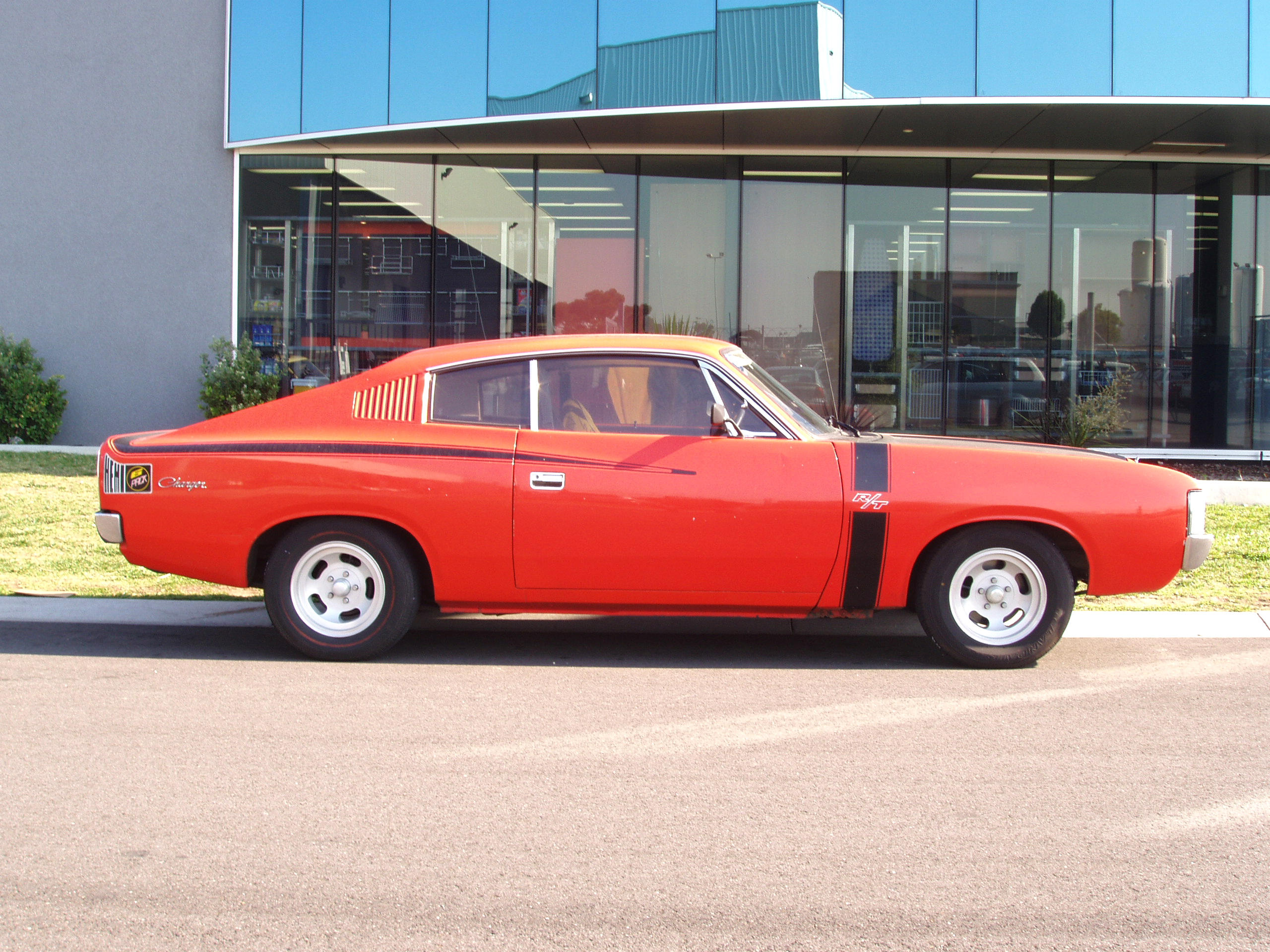
1971 Chrysler Australia's Valiant Charger

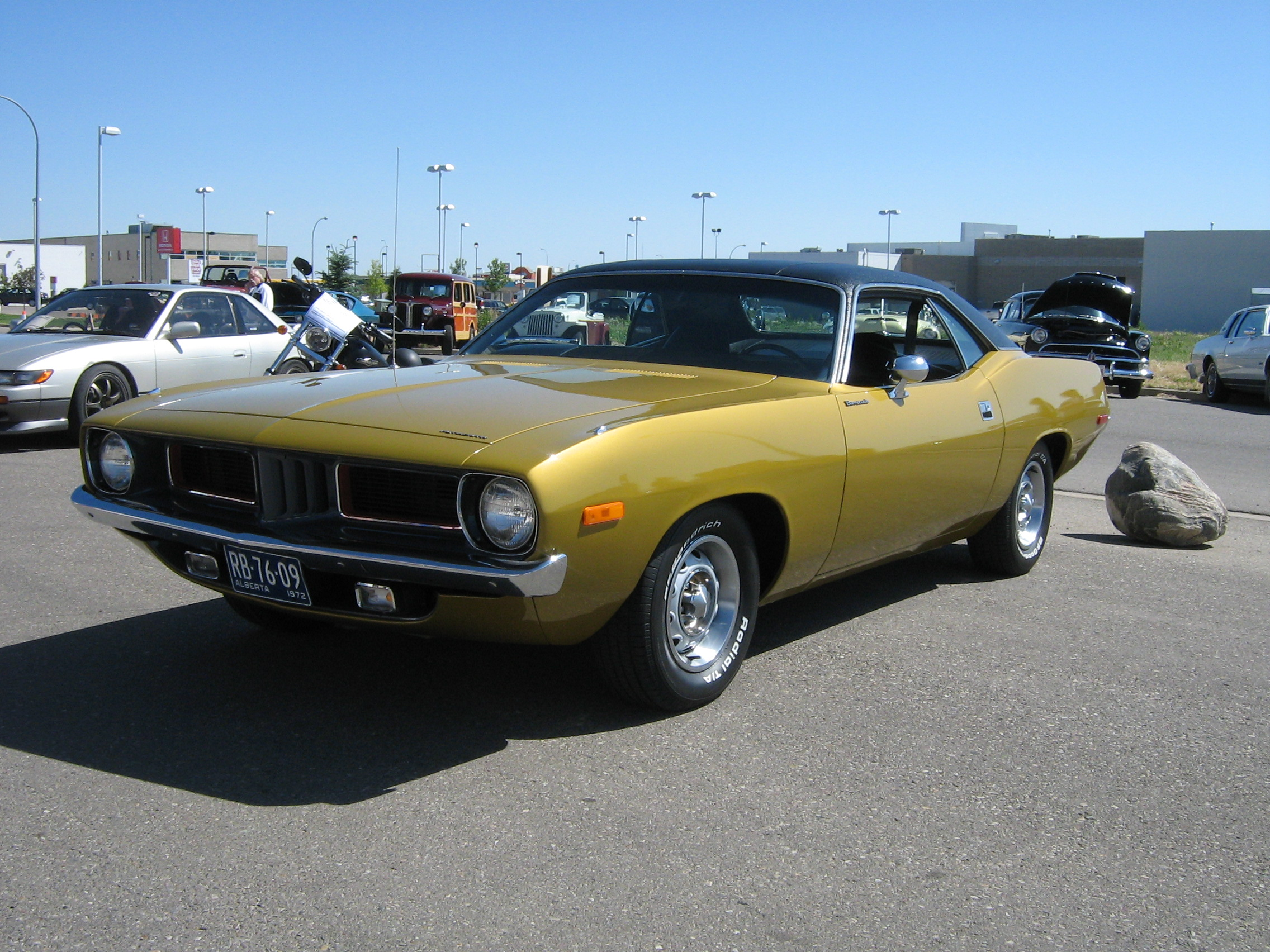
1972 Plymouth Barracuda

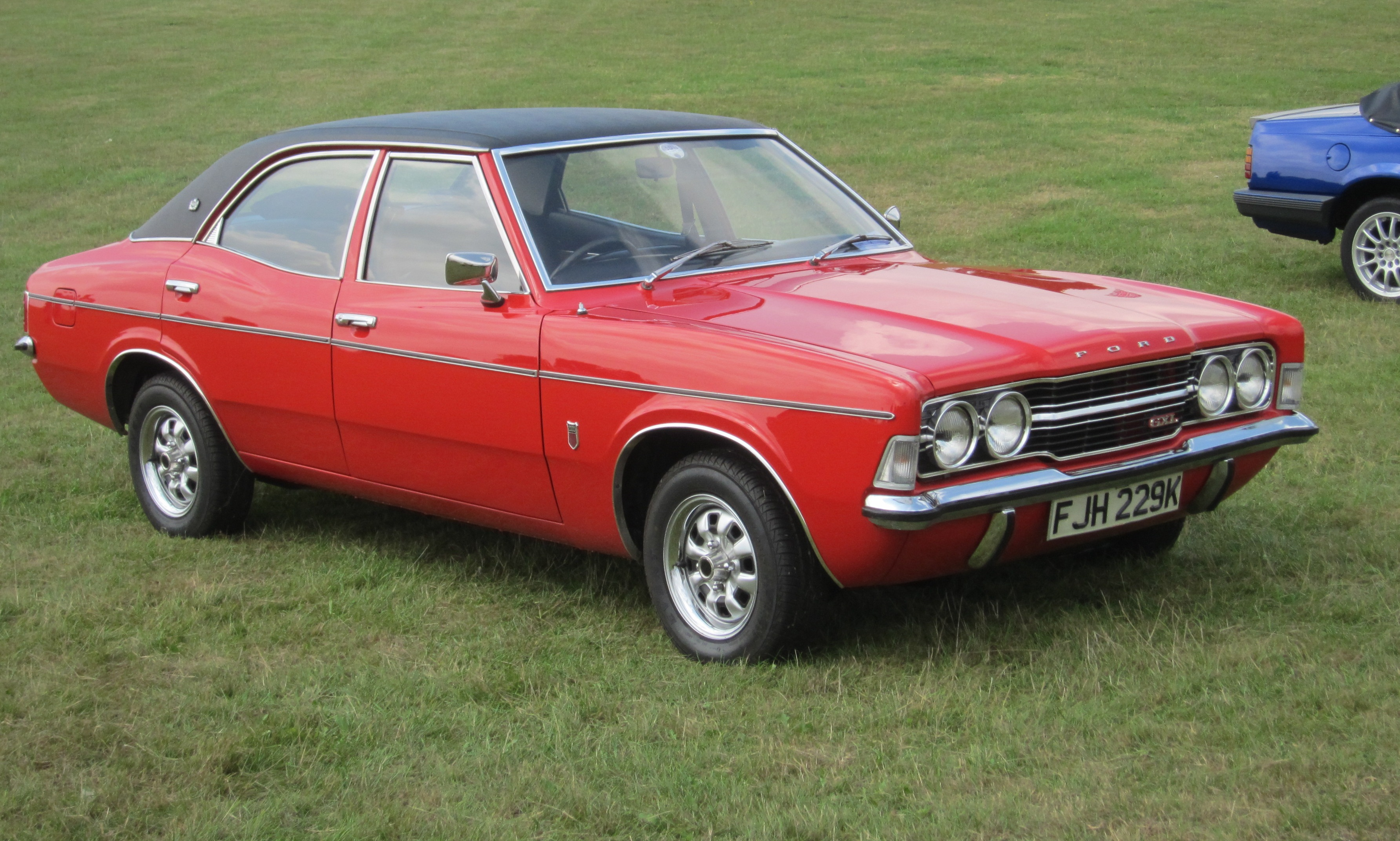
1972 Ford Cortina Mark III

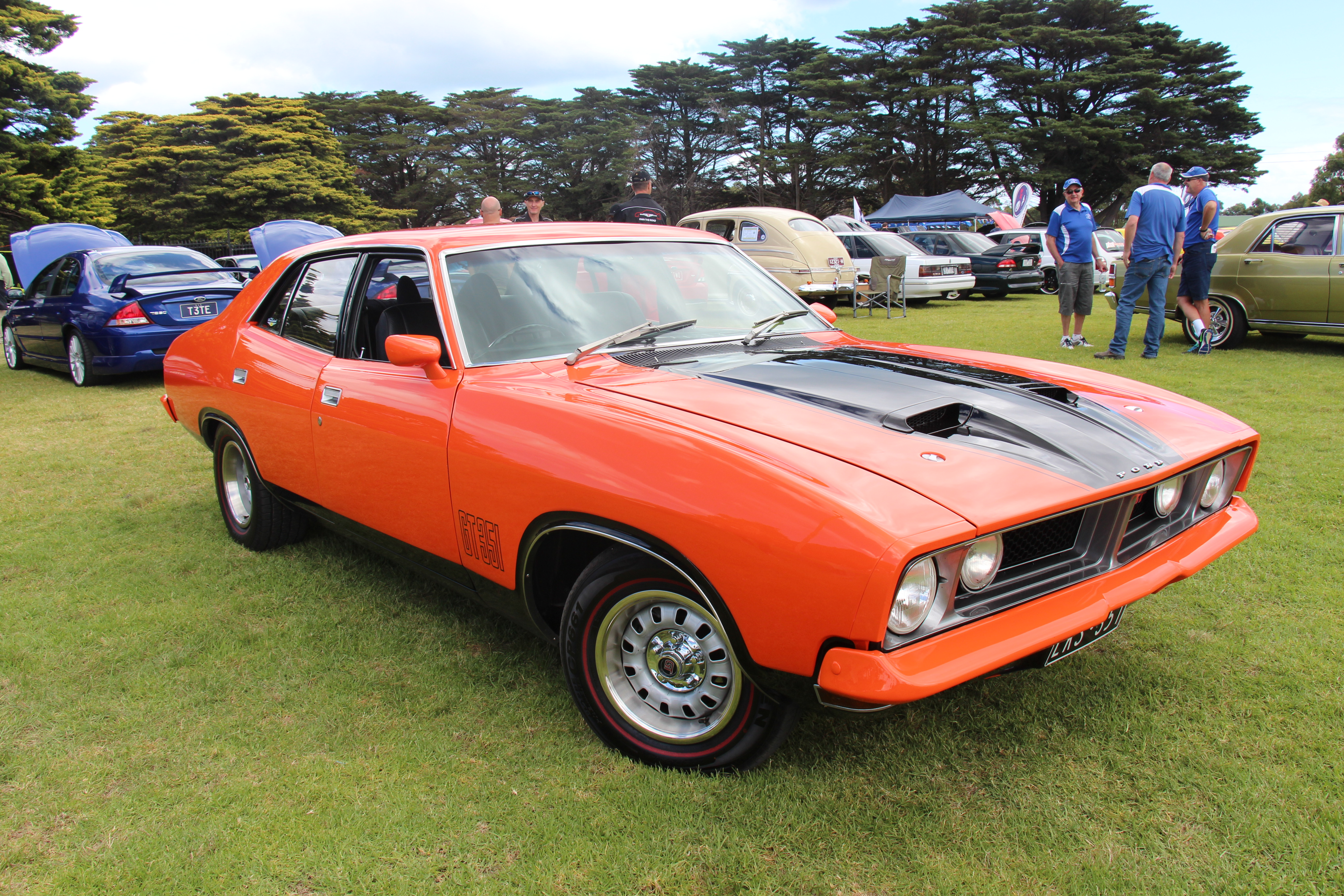
1973-1976 Ford Falcon XB

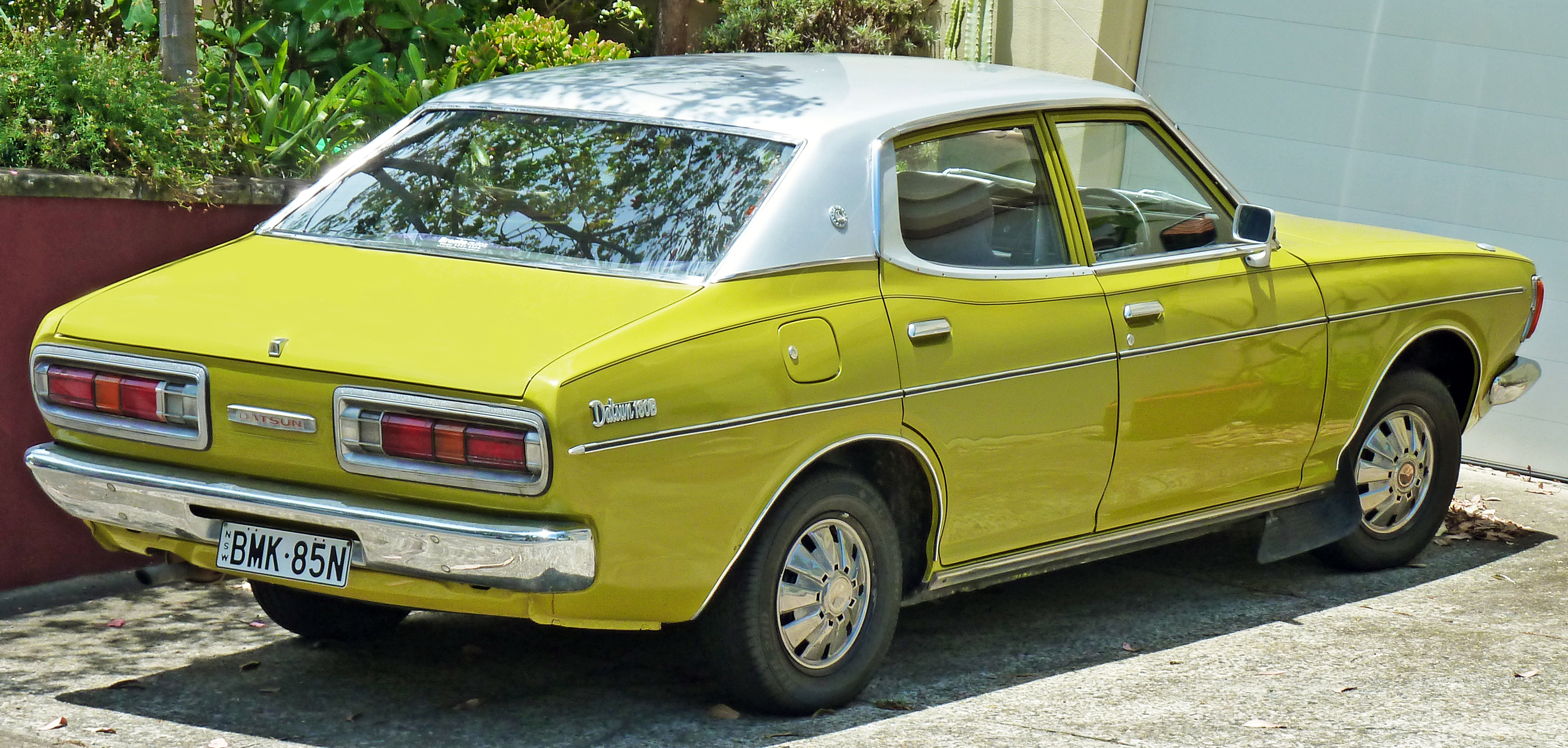
1977 Datsun 180B GL sedan

== See also ==
- Influence of the Space Age on culture
- Jet Age
