= Bottom breather =

Front-engine automobile

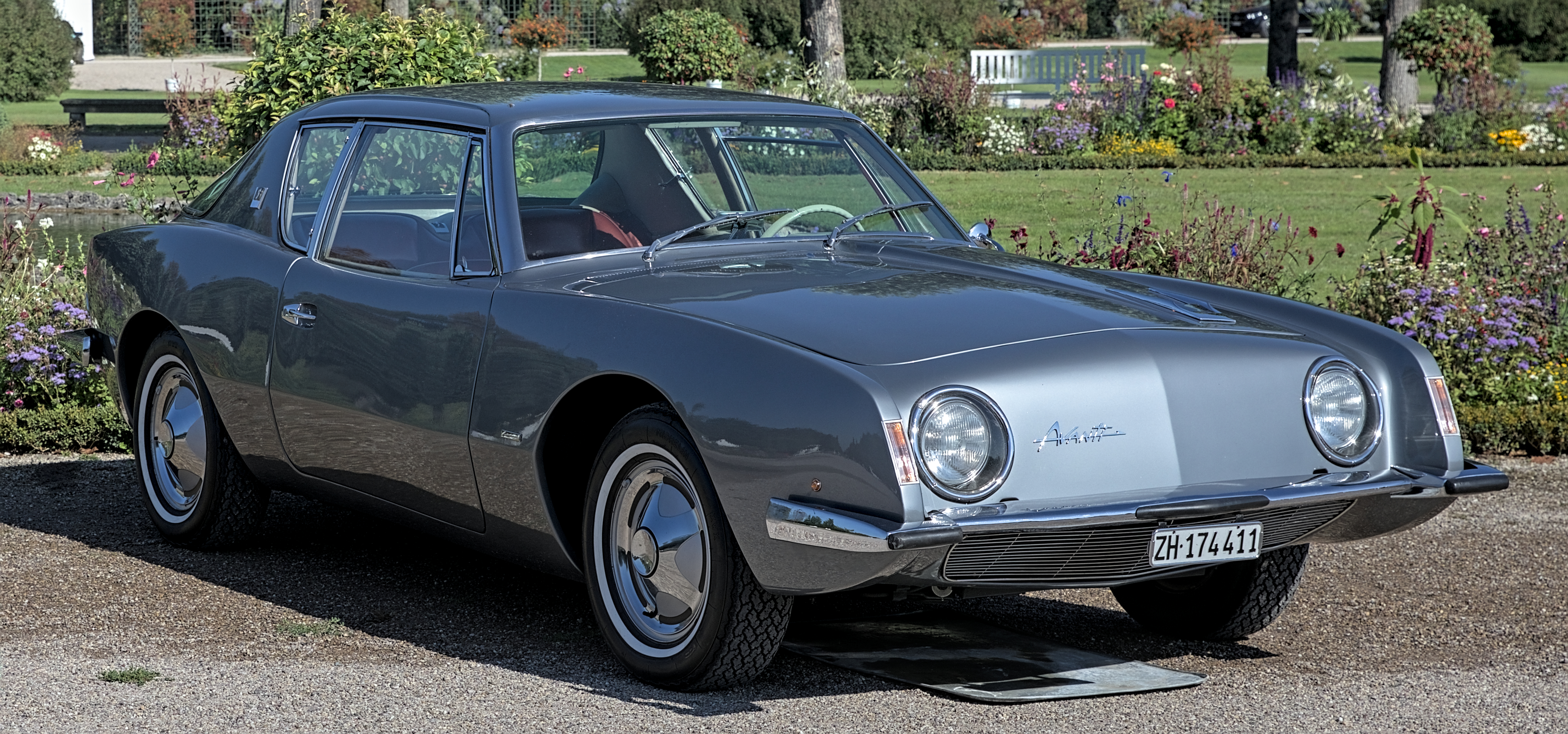
Studebaker Avanti

A bottom breather is a front-engine automobile that takes in air from below the front fascia (nose) rather than through a conventional grille at the front of the vehicle. This styling can provide a more aerodynamic front end, or the appearance of better aerodynamics, or the look of a rear-engined sports car such as the Porsche 911. A potential disadvantage of having a lower air intake is the greater chance of items being sucked into the engine such as water or debris.

Unlike a rear-engined car, however, most of the vehicles that use this approach have the engines installed in the front, with a water cooled radiator installed. The airflow from below the bumper is then directed into the radiator to aid in engine cooling, which makes this approach unusual in that a traditional front grille was an evolution from installing the radiator externally for vehicles manufactured since the early days of automobile production. Some of the most well known bottom breathing cars are the Citroën DS, Chevrolet Corvette C4, Studebaker Avanti, Honda Logo, Infiniti Q45, Mazda MX-5, Mazda MX-6, Volkswagen Passat, and the Volvo 480.

Some vehicles disguise the lower air intake with a grille above the bumper which is not functional, like the Dodge Avenger coupe and Chrysler Sebring of the same generation.
