= Grille (car) =

Part on the front of a car

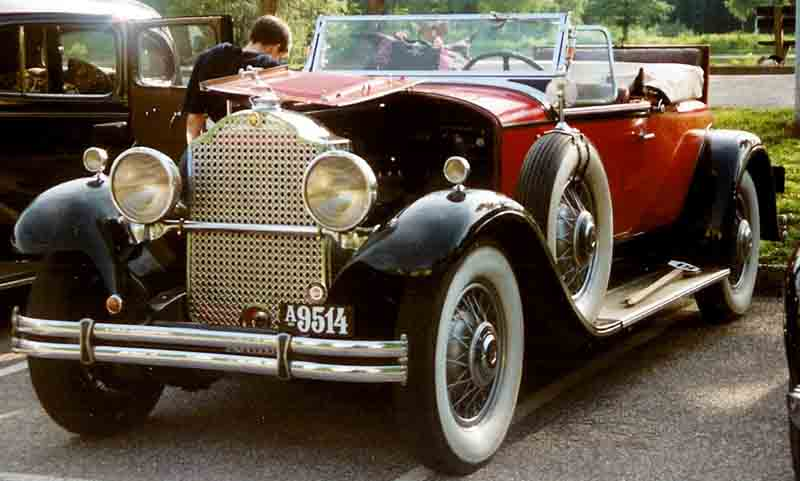
Gravel shield installed on a 1930 Packard Eight Roadster

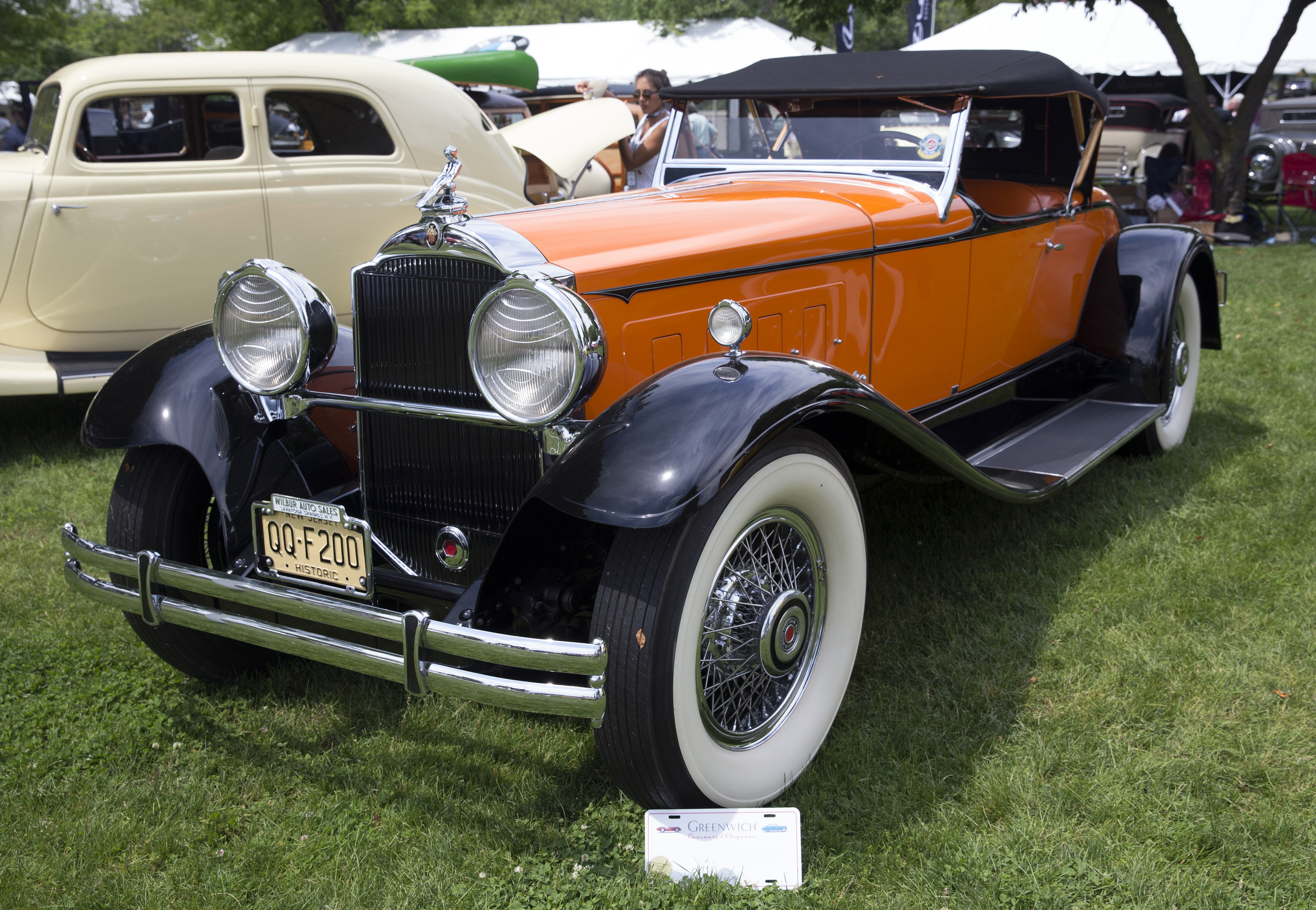
1930 Packard Standard Eight roadster without gravel shield

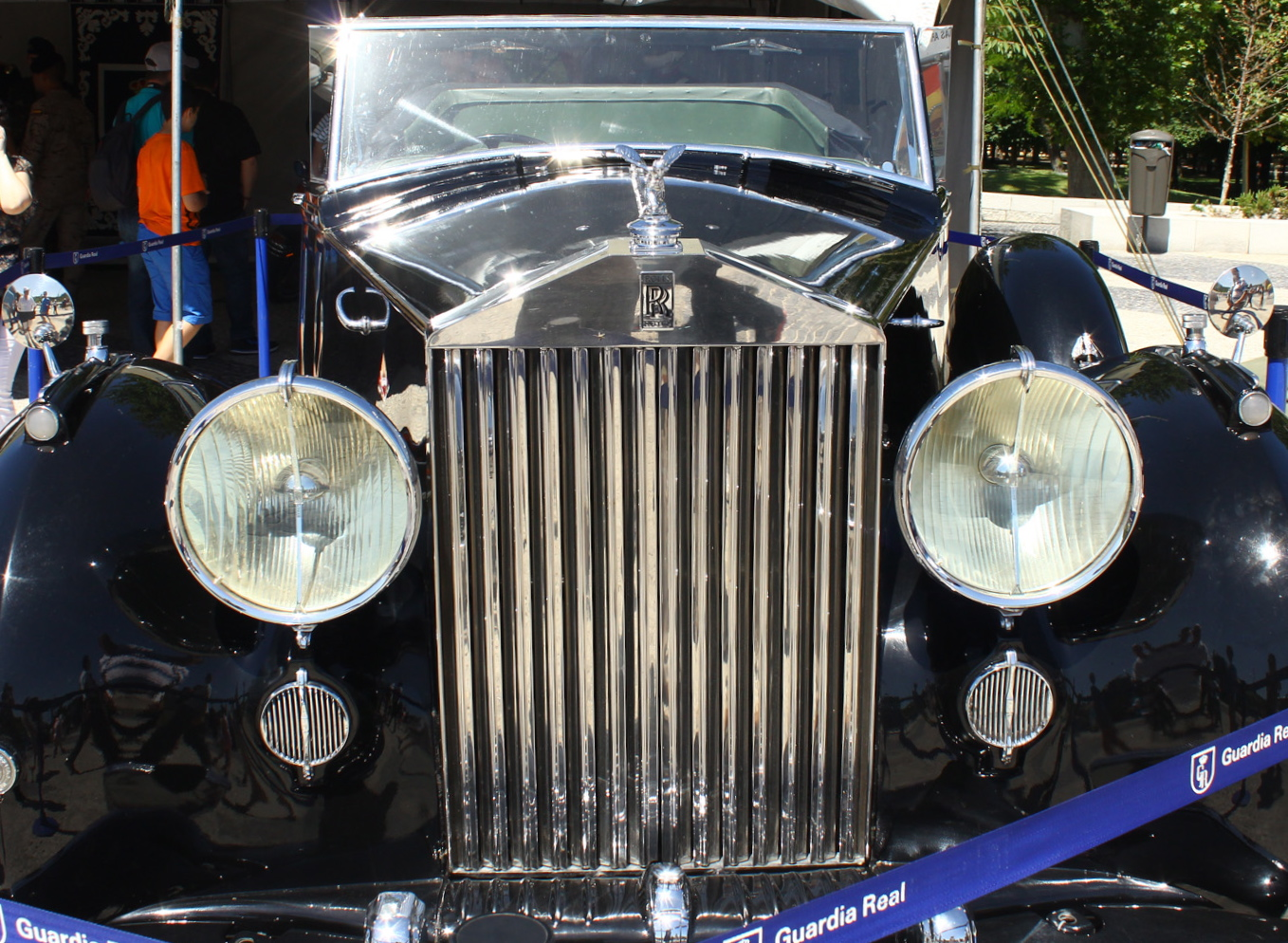
1952 Rolls-Royce Phantom IV with the emblematic Parthenon style radiator grille. Top and front surfaces look dead flat but are actually a few thousandths convex, so they will look flat in accordance with design principles learned from the ancient Greeks.

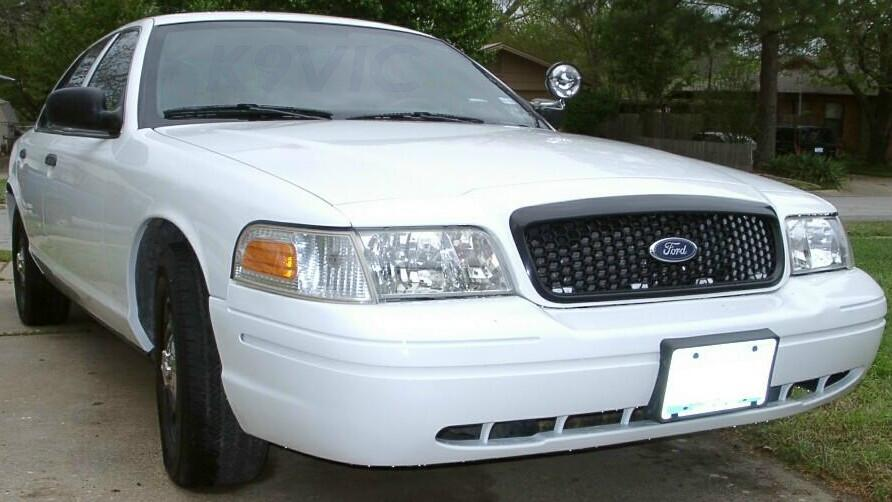
Ford Crown Victoria Police Interceptor black honeycomb grille

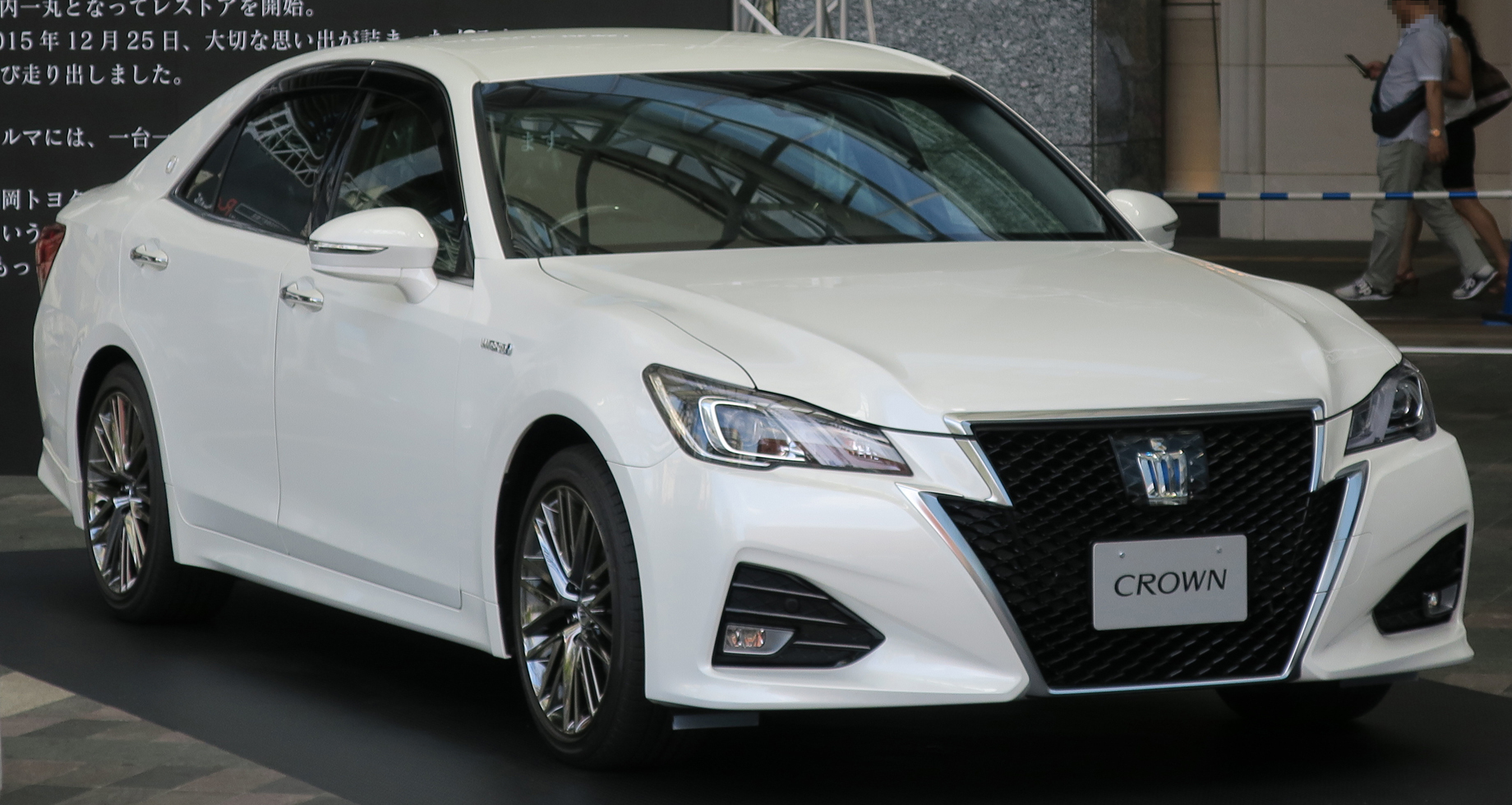
Stylized "crown" grille on a Toyota Crown

In automotive engineering, a grille covers an opening in the body of a vehicle to allow air to enter or exit. Most vehicles feature a grille at the front of the vehicle to protect the radiator. Merriam-Webster describes grilles as "a grating forming a barrier or screen; especially: an ornamental one at the front end of an automobile." The word 'grille' is commonly misspelled as 'grill' which instead refers to the cooking method. Other common grille locations include below the front bumper, in front of the wheels (to cool the brakes), in the cowl for cabin ventilation, or on the rear deck lid (in rear engine vehicles). Grilles evolved from previously installed gravel shields that were designed to protect exposed radiators typically used on cars until the early 1930s.

== Design ==
The front fascia of a motor vehicle has an important role in attracting buyers. The principal function of the grille is to admit cooling air to the car's radiator. However, the look of the vehicle "matters a great deal more than whether the design features actually serve any function." As one of the main visual components on the front of vehicles, "an inspired grille design makes a car attractive and shapes its identity by tying it to the carmaker's history and reputation."

Currently, big grilles are primarily cosmetic. The grille is often a distinctive styling element, and many marques use it as their primary brand identifier. For example, Jeep has trademarked its seven-bar grille style.

Rolls-Royce is known for arranging its grille bars by hand to ensure that they appear perfectly vertical. Other makers known for their grille styling include Bugatti's horse-collar, BMW's split kidney, Rover's chrome "teeth", Mitsubishi's forward swept, fighter aircraft-style grilles for their cars 2008 Lancer and Lancer Evo X, Dodge's cross bar, Alfa Romeo's six-bar shield, Volvo's slash bar, Nissan's trapezoid shaped chrome surround, Mazda's rotary engine shape, Audi's relatively new, so-called single-frame grille, Pontiac's split horizontal grille and an egg-crate grille on late-generation Plymouths, and Lexus's spindle-shaped grille. The unusual 1971 Plymouth Barracuda grille is known as a cheesegrater. Ford's three-bar grille, introduced on the 2006 Fusion, has become distinctive as well. Porsche, a long-time manufacturer of air-cooled cars, continues to minimize the prominence of a "grille" on the marque's modern water-cooled vehicles in keeping with that heritage.

The contrary styling pattern also occurs. Starting from the late 1930s, Cadillac would alternate its pattern from horizontal bars to various patterns of crosshatching as a simple way of making the car look new from year to year, for this make did not have a standard grille form. Sometimes there is a sort of fashion trend in grille bars. For example, in the early years after World War II, many American car makers generally switched to fewer and thicker grille bars.

A billet grille is an aftermarket part that is used to enhance the style or function of the original OEM grille. They are generally made from billet, solid bar stock aircraft-grade aluminum, although some are CNC machined from one solid sheet of aluminum.

Active Air Flap System was developed by Hyundai Mobis on June 17, 2021. Based on the existing radiator grille, the grille itself has evolved to move according to the cooling water temperature. When the engine coolant temperature is high, the air flap is opened to increase cooling efficiency through air suction. On the contrary, when the temperature drops, the air flap is automatically closed to reduce air resistance to increase fuel efficiency and electricity consumption.

Customizers would alter the grille as a matter of course in personalizing their car, taking the grille bar from another make, for example. Even sheet metal with patterned holes for ventilation grating sold to homeowners for repair has been found filling the grille opening of custom cars.

=== Electric Vehicles ===
The emergence of electric vehicles (EV) in the automotive market has prompted a fundamental reevaluation of grille design, as electric motors need little to no front vent cooling compared to a traditional combustion engine. Still, customer expectations of grilles dominating the front of cars have proven strong enough that companies like Nissan have reincorporated cosmetic grilles into their EV designs in response to mixed consumer reception of early grilleless models. Designs that fully do away with any visual reference to traditional front grilles have tended to come from new auto makers that exclusively produce EVs, such as Tesla, Inc. or Rivian, as these companies do not have an established historical brand language of grilles.

== Grille types ==
Per mounting location on the car body:

- Radiator grille (front engine vehicle);
- Roof or trunk grilles (rear engine vehicles);
- Bumper skirt grilles (front and rear);
- Fender grilles (brake ventilation duct covers);
- Hood scoop grille (to allow intercooler air flow)

=== Per style ===
The American aftermarket restyling industry defines two major grille styles:

- OEM factory-style grilles – Such grilles have no difference with those manufactured by the automobile producers;
- Custom style – produced in small quantities and have an assortment of materials.

=== Per fastening method ===
- Bolt over style

In this installation method, the billet grille simply bolts over the existing OEM plastic grille. This method does not require drilling or cutting of the OEM grille shell. Hidden bolts, brackets and clamps are used for this simple installation. The downside is it may not look as clean as the replacement style, because you can still see the OEM grille underneath. Bolt overs should take no more than 30 minutes to install.

- Replacement style

The OEM grille must first be removed and then the replacement billet grille must be mounted in place of the OEM grille. Drilling and sometimes cutting is required for this method. Installation instructions are provided by the grille manufacturer, but are still a challenging job.

=== History ===
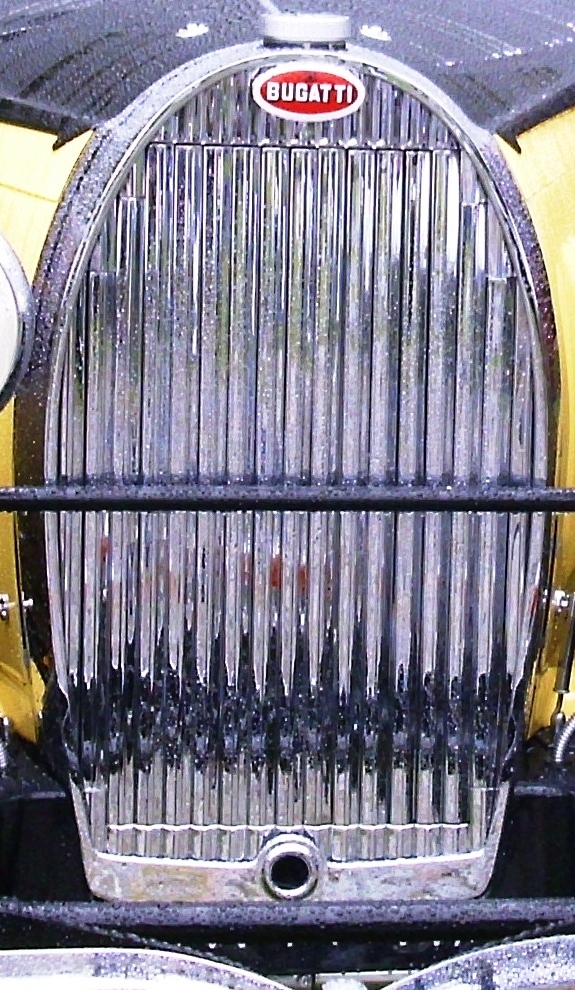
1934 Bugatti Type 57 Stelvio radiator grille

Grilles on automobiles have taken on different designs through the years. This feature first appeared on automobiles in 1903. Several years later, the arch-shaped design became common and became the standard design on automobile grilles for many years. The "split" grille design first appeared in 1923 on the Alfa Romeo sports car.

In the 1930s and 1940s, automobile manufacturers became creative with their grille designs. Some of these designs were bell-shaped (Buick, Chevrolet, and Pontiac), split and slightly folded (Silver Arrow, Mercury, 1946 Oldsmobile), cross-shaped (pre-war Studebaker Champion models, 1941 Cadillac, 1942 Ford), while some including Packard, Rolls-Royce, and MG-TC models still followed the older arch-shaped design.

Grilles took on a new look after World War II. Following the introduction of the 1947 Buick, Studebaker, and Kaiser, grilles became shorter and wider to accommodate for the change in design.

== See also ==
- Bottom breather, vehicles without a grille
- Diffuser (automotive)
- Grating
- List of auto parts
