= Michael Eugene Kelly =

Mexican American businessman (1949–2013)

- Born: 6 October 1949
- Died: 22 December 2013 (aged 64)
- Occupations: Businessman, Resort Operator
- Known for: Operation of fraudulent resort enterprises and Ponzi scheme involving Avanti Motor Corporation
- Criminal charges: Fraud, Ponzi scheme

Michael Eugene Kelly (6 October 1949 – 22 December 2013) was a dual citizen of the U.S. and Mexico who operated a number of fraudulent resort enterprises and the Avanti Motor Corporation. In 2007, with 23 others, he was accused by the FBI and the United States Attorney's Office of operating an enormous Ponzi scheme that defrauded over a thousand elderly and senior citizens of their retirement money. It was later disclosed that 7,000 victims from throughout the U.S. lost more than $342 million.

== Fraud charges ==
Kelly was arrested at the Mayo Clinic in Rochester, Minnesota on December 22, 2006. He claimed to earn $55,000 a year and had only $48,000 in assets, yet he offered a private jet, four yachts and a race track as collateral at his detention hearing. All of his assets were located outside the U.S. He was denied bail and remanded to the Metropolitan Correctional Center, Chicago.

Kelly attempted to avoid indictment by arranging a plea agreement that included paying restitution to the victims. On 14 May 2008, he pleaded not guilty to 14 counts of fraud and was remanded in custody. On April 14, 2009, a court permanently enjoined him from violating sections of the Securities Exchange Act of 1934. On June 30, 2012, he remained in prison as the court liquidated assets with a view to providing partial restitution to victims of the Ponzi scheme.

In December 2012, he was sentenced to 5 years in prison with a $10-million bond to secure lenient periods of house arrest for treatment of colorectal cancer.

Kelly died on December 22, 2013, in South Bend, Indiana.
