= Avanti (car) =

American performance sports car

Avanti II
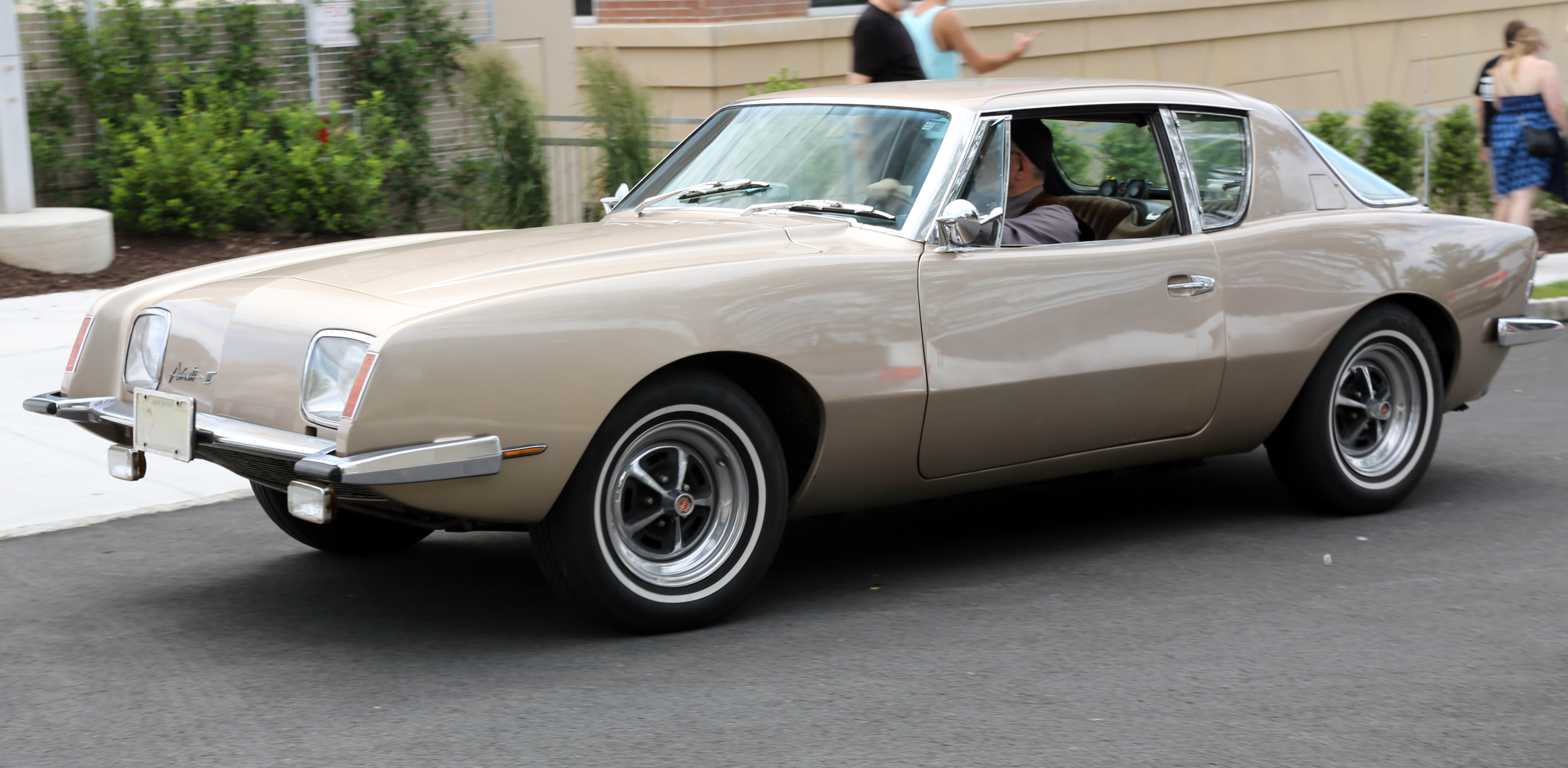
- 1967 Avanti II

Body and chassis
- Body style: 2-door coupe; 2-door convertible; 4-door sedan
- Layout: FR layout
- Related: Studebaker Avanti

The Avanti (including the Avanti II) is an American performance sports coupe based on the Studebaker Avanti and marketed through a succession of five different ownership arrangements between 1965 and 2006. After Studebaker's 1963 closure of its South Bend, Indiana, factory and effective discontinuation of the auto with the 1964 model year, cars carrying the Avanti nameplate were initially produced from leftover Studebaker components, and later by the Avanti Motor Company from General Motors and Ford chassis and engines. A small and often interrupted stream of increasingly modified cars was made before all production ceased in 2006.

== Avanti II (1965–1986) ==
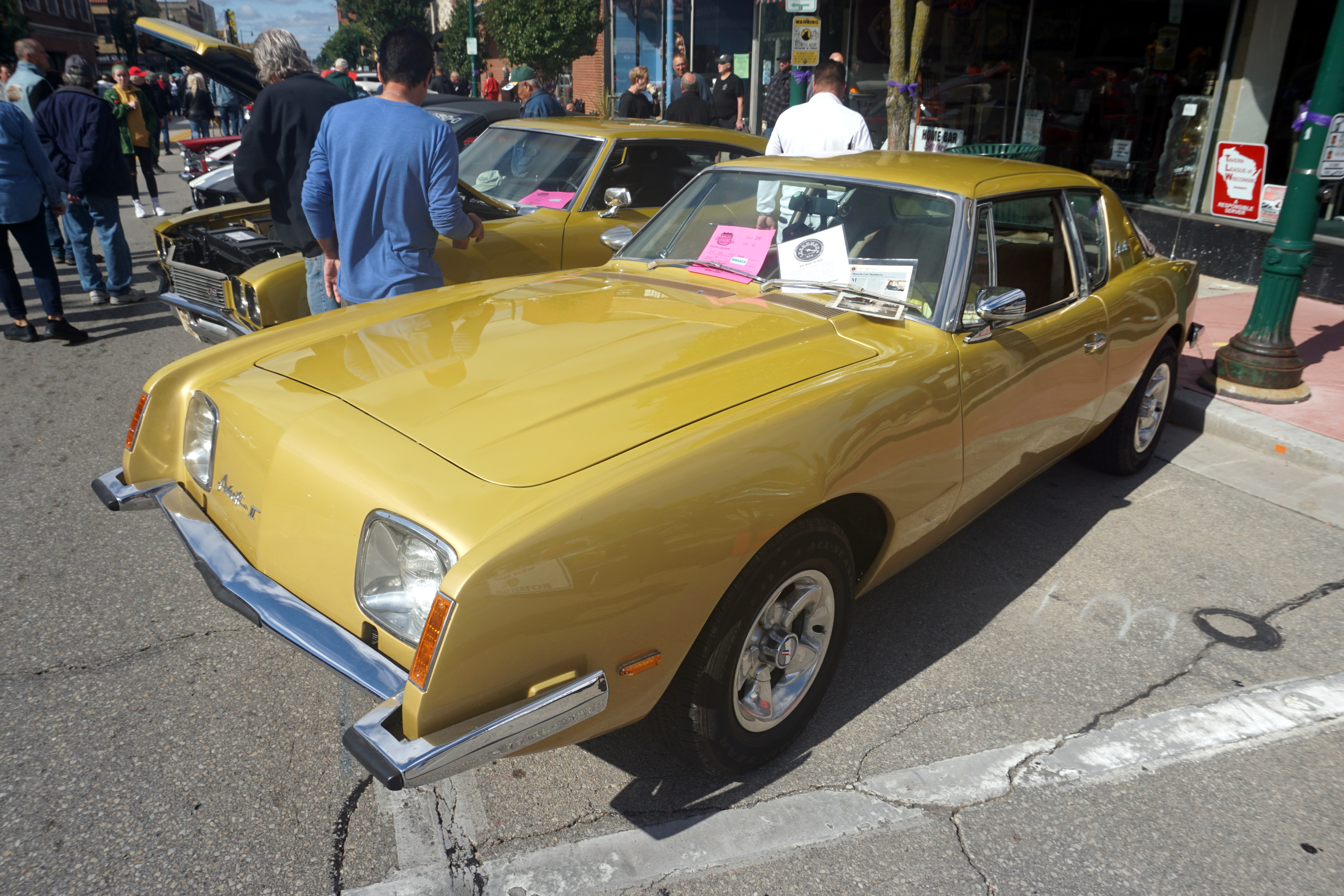
1970 Avanti II

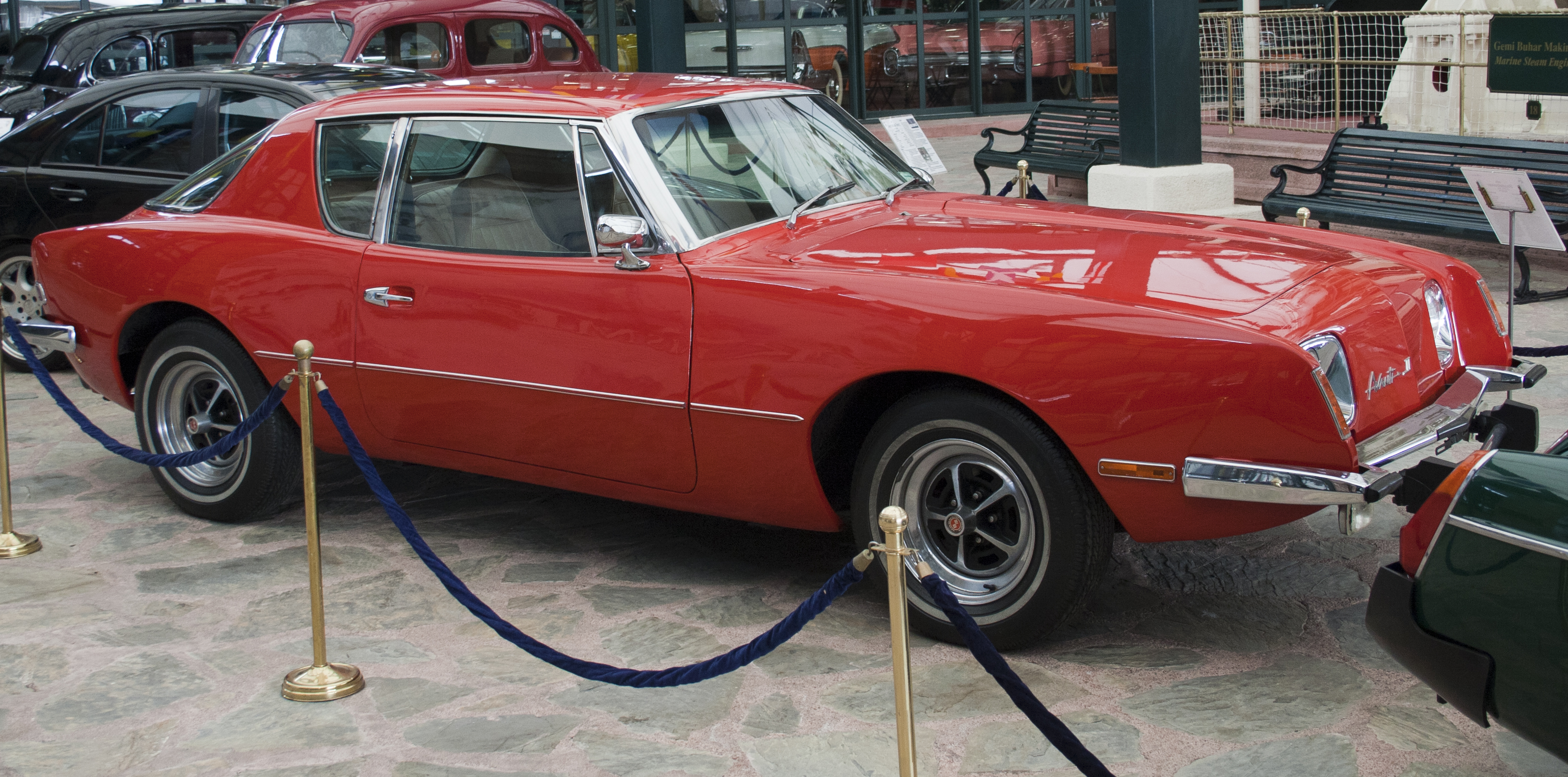
1976 Avanti II

After Studebaker ended production at South Bend on December 20, 1963, the "Avanti" model name, tooling, Studebaker truck production rights, as well as parts and plant space were bought by local Studebaker dealers, Nate and Arnold Altman and Leo Newman, who incorporated as Avanti Motor Corporation and hand-built a small number of cars. Leo Newman ran the Studebaker truck parts division, which enabled the company to be profitable at its outset. According to Stu Chapman, Studebaker Director of Advertising & Public Relations 1964–1966, in his book "My Father The Car: Memoirs Of My Life With Studebaker", there was talk with Studebaker about reintroducing the Avanti to Studebaker showrooms in 1965/66, along with ambitious plans for rebadging an Isuzu Bellett as an entry-level Studebaker, and combining with Canadian Motor Industries.

The Altman brothers introduced a slightly modified version of the car in 1965 under the brand name "Avanti II". which initially had a 327 cu in (5.4 L) Chevrolet Corvette engine. This evolved to the 400, then the small-block 350, and then the 305 for 1981. The 305 cu in (5.0 L) V8 had electronic engine controls, 155 hp (116 kW), and GM's Turbo 350 automatic transmission with lock-up. Building one of the 1980s Avanti IIs required 10 to 12 weeks, depending on special color or upholstery orders. The last Avanti II made was a one-off with a Roush V6 engine. After Nate Altman's death, Arnold Altman ran the company until it was sold in 1982. From 1963 through 1985, Avanti IIs were built on the Studebaker-designed chassis, then the Chevrolet Monte Carlo chassis was used; Chevy discontinued the Monte Carlo in 1987, and Avanti switched to the Chevrolet Caprice chassis.

Year	Engine	Power	Wheelbase	Length	Width	Chassis	Transmission	Instrumentation
1965	327 cu in (5.4 L) V8	300 hp (224 kW)	109 in (2,769 mm)	192.5 in (4,890 mm)	70.4 in (1,788 mm)	Full perimeter with X	4-speed manual or automatic	Speedometer, tachometer, fuel gauge, ammeter, temperature gauge, oil pressure gauge, vacuum pressure gauge

On October 1, 1982, real estate developer Stephen H. Blake bought the rights to the Avanti II. The state of Indiana guaranteed $1.9 million in loans to Avanti as part of the financial package offered Blake when he bought the company.

Modifications were introduced to the car, which had remained unchanged since the production of the Avanti II model began in the mid-1960s. A new convertible body style along with an all-new and lighter backbone chassis that was designed by Herb Adams, a former Pontiac engineer, using a torque tube with a 1985 Chevrolet Corvette aluminum rear end and independent suspension. These plans were shelved in favor of the G-body Monte Carlo chassis as it could accept Chevrolet V8s. The newly approved rectangular headlights with matching openings were introduced along with plastic body-colored bumpers. Each car took eight to ten weeks to hand-build.

Shortly after introducing the Mark II Avanti, the company declared bankruptcy, and Blake resigned in February 1986.

== Avanti (1987–2006) ==
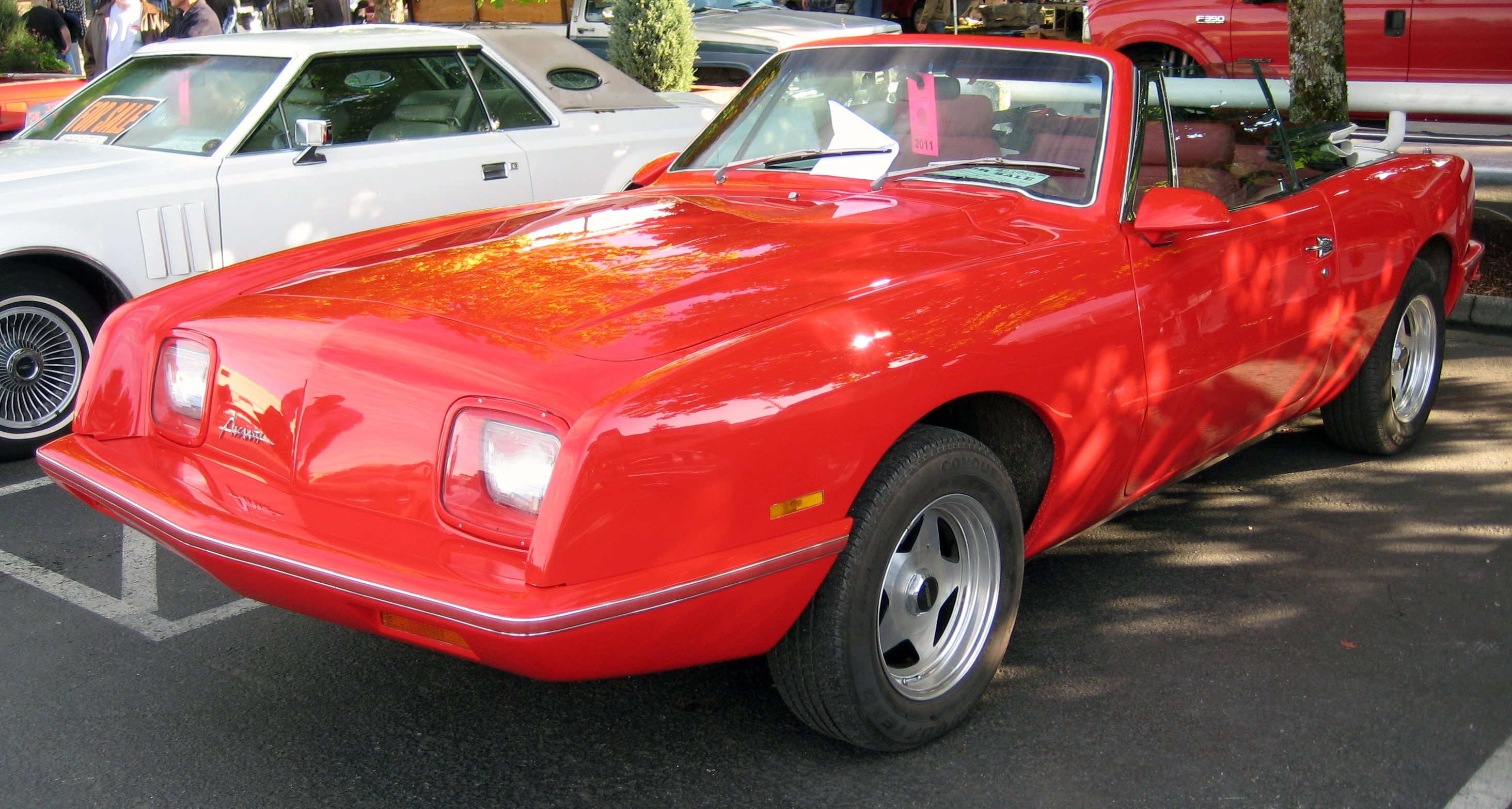
1989 Avanti II Convertible

The Avanti Motor Company was subsequently purchased by Michael Eugene Kelly, whose ownership was very brief because the company's ownership changed in 1987. The "II" was dropped from the car's name and all subsequent cars were called the "Avanti". The company then had second-generation Avanti styling originated by Tom Kellogg, the youngest member of the original Studebaker Avanti design team.

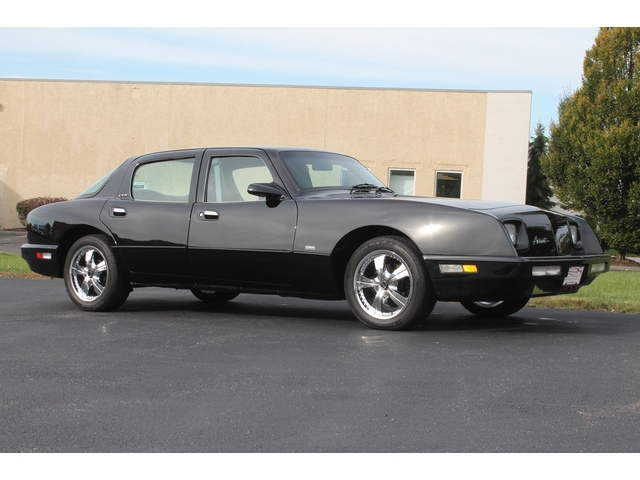
1991 Avanti four-door sedan

The company was acquired and run from 1987 until 1991 by John J. Cafaro, a real estate developer from Ohio. With the financial assistance from the Ohio government, he moved all Avanti production from South Bend to Youngstown, Ohio. In 1988 and 1989, Avanti made two-door coupes and a convertible. The 1988 Avanti was called the "Silver Year" models, marking 25 years since the Avanti's introduction.

In 1989, Cafaro lost faith in the original coupe and introduced a four-door version, of which 90 were built. Only 405 Avantis were made in four years at the Youngstown plant, which closed in 1991.

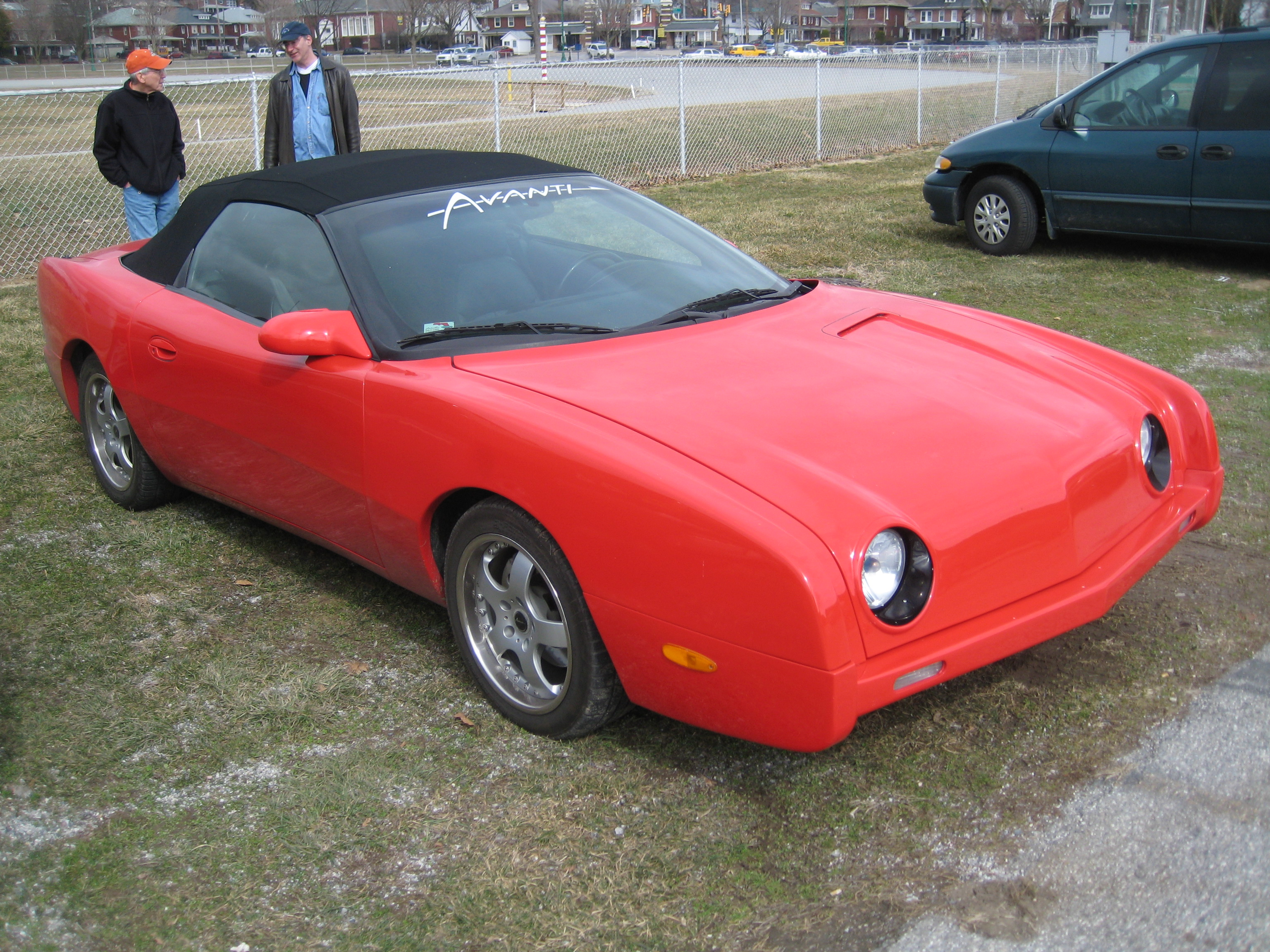
1996-2006 Avanti convertible

Kelly repurchased the company in 1999. He moved its operations from Ohio and produced redesigned Avanti automobiles in Villa Rica, Georgia from 2000 to 2005. From 2004, Ford Mustang chassis and engines were used. In October 2005, an Internet report said, "Avanti Motors [had] recently announced a new relationship with Ford Motor Company and was planning a big comeback".

In early 2006, Kelly moved Avanti production to a new plant in Cancun, Mexico. Still, the company floundered after Kelly's arrest on fraud charges in December 2006 over a large Ponzi scheme he was running. The last Avanti rolled off the line in Cancun, Mexico in March 2006. All the Mustang-based Avantis used V8 engines, with the option of a Ford V6. Only one 2006 Avanti was built with a Ford V6 engine. The factory and showroom were emptied in 2011 and have been sold. Many extremely rare Studebaker and Avanti concepts and racing vehicles on the second floor of the building in Cancun have been moved elsewhere and/or sold.
