= Studebaker Avanti =

Personal luxury car

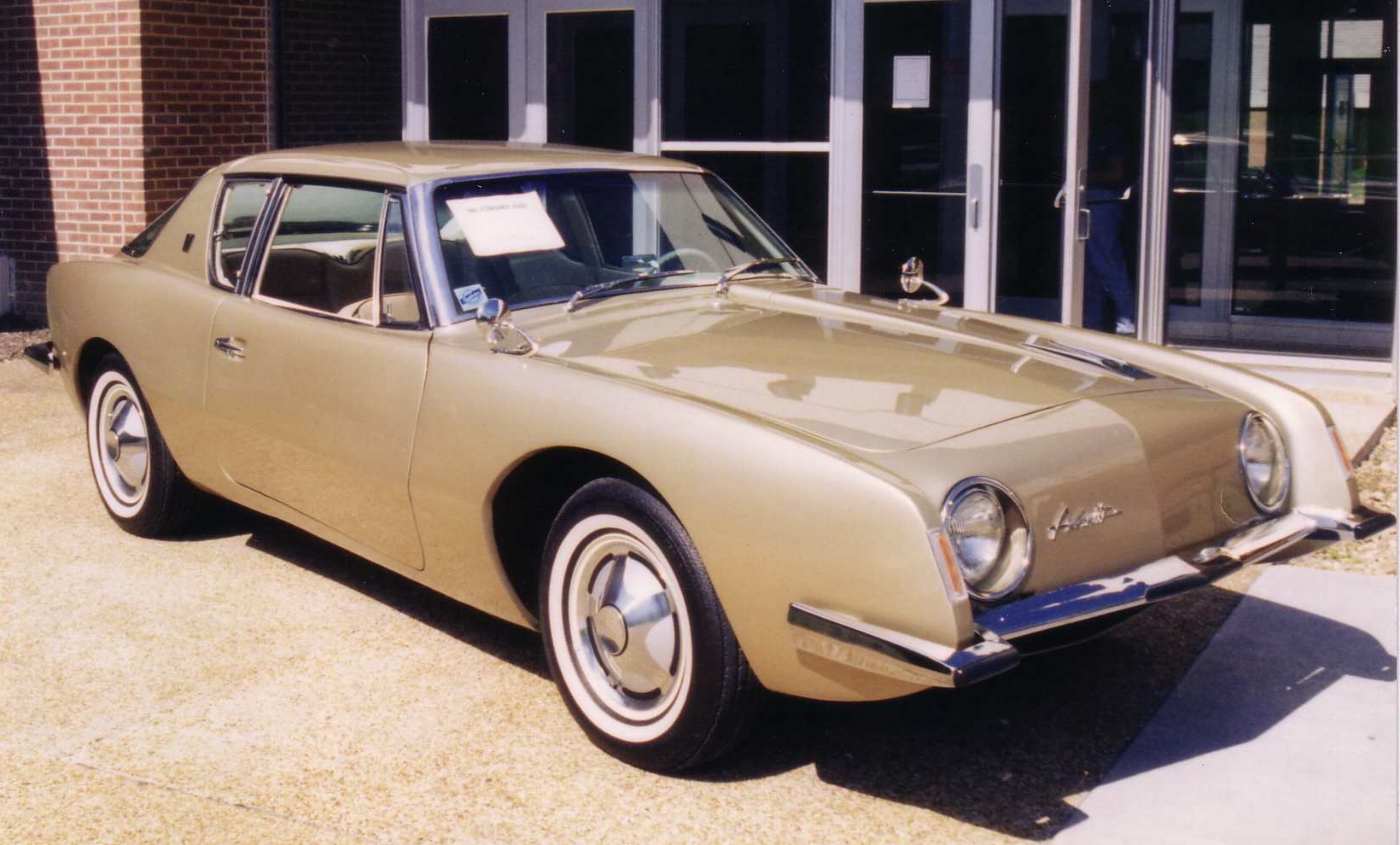
- 1963 Studebaker Avanti

Overview
- Manufacturer: Studebaker Corporation
- Also called: Avanti
- Production: 1962: 1,200; 1963: fewer than 4,600
- Assembly: Studebaker Automotive Plant, South Bend, Indiana
- Designer: Raymond Loewy and Associates

Body and chassis
- Class: Personal luxury car
- Body style: 2-door coupe
- Layout: FR layout
- Related: Studebaker Lark

Powertrain
- Engine: 289 cu in (4.7 L) 240 hp (243 PS; 179 kW) V8 (1963)
- Transmission: 3-speed manual 4-speed manual 3-speed automatic

Dimensions
- Wheelbase: 109 in (2,769 mm)
- Length: 192.4 in (4,887 mm)
- Width: 70.3 in (1,786 mm)
- Height: 53.8 in (1,367 mm)
- Curb weight: 3,095 lb (1,404 kg)

Chronology
- Predecessor: Studebaker Gran Turismo Hawk

The Studebaker Avanti is a personal luxury coupe manufactured and marketed by Studebaker Corporation between June 1962 and December 1963. A halo car for the maker, it was marketed as "America's only four-passenger high-performance personal car."

Described as "one of the more significant milestones of the postwar industry", the Raymond Loewy-designed car offered safety features and high-speed performance. Called "the fastest production car in the world" upon its introduction, a modified Avanti reached over 170 mph (270 km/h) with its supercharged 289-cubic-inch (4,740 cm^{3}) R3 engine at the Bonneville Salt Flats. In all, it broke 29 world speed records at the Bonneville Salt Flats.

Following Studebaker's discontinuation of the model, a succession of five ventures manufactured and marketed derivatives of the Avanti model through 2006. These ventures licensed intellectual property and, in some cases procured parts, through arrangements with the successors to the Studebaker assets.

== Name ==
Studebaker's advertising agency provided the name Avanti. In Italian it means "forward" or "onward".

== Design ==
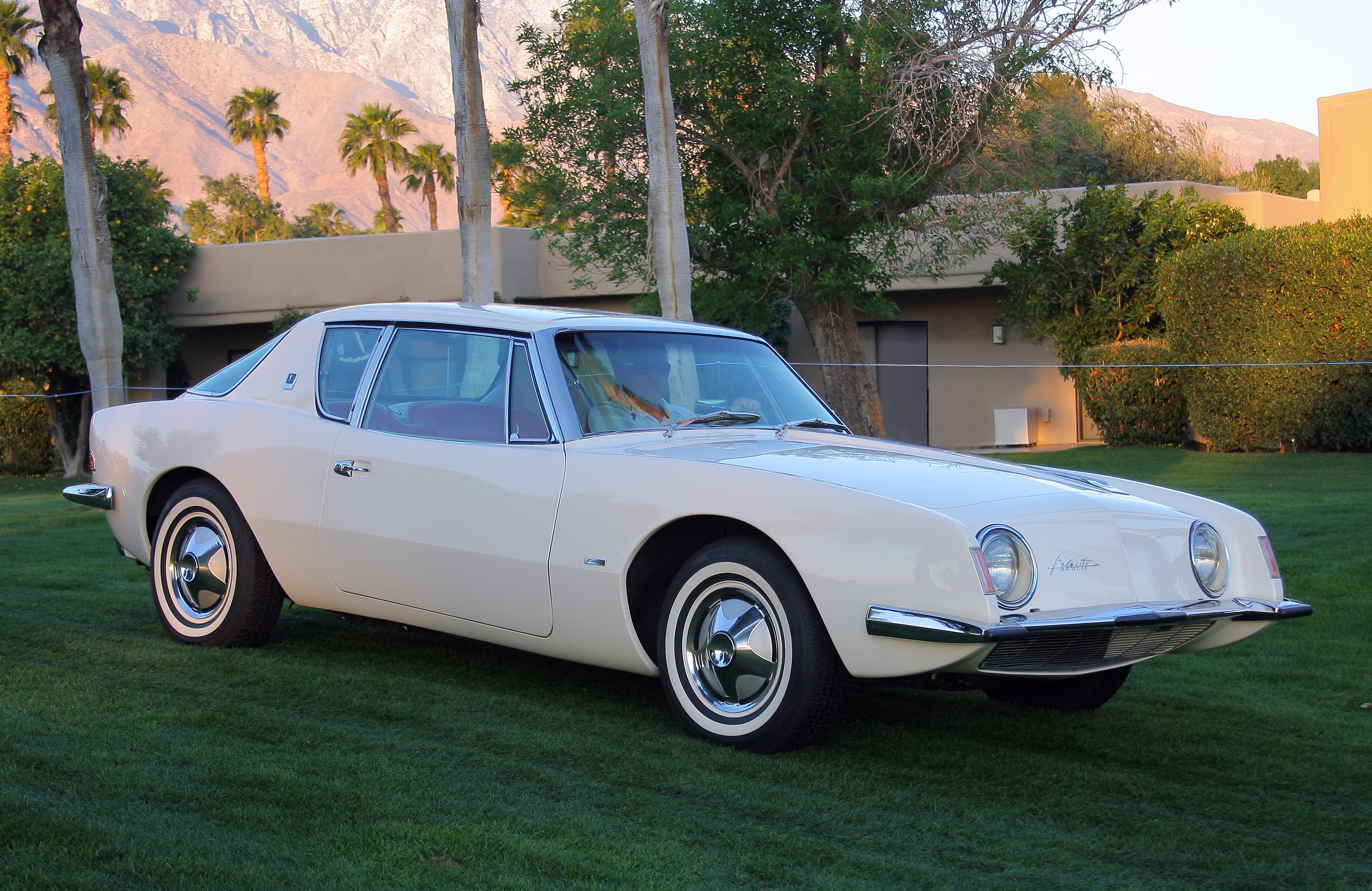
1963 Studebaker Avanti

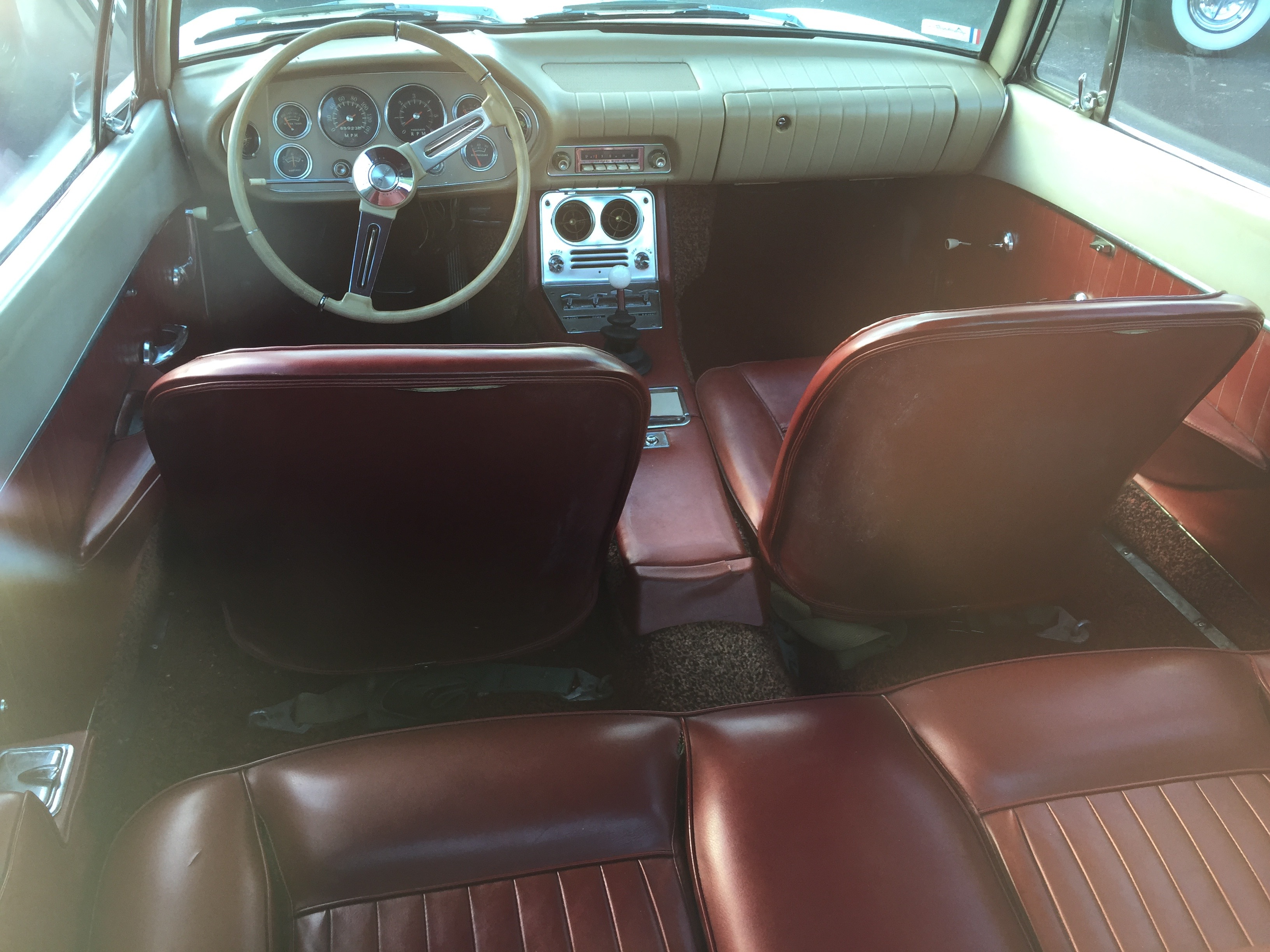
1963 Studebaker Avanti interior

The Avanti was developed at the direction of Studebaker president, Sherwood Egbert, who took over in February 1961. The car's design theme was "allegedly doodled by Egbert on the proverbial back of an envelope during an airplane flight." Egbert's 'doodle' was to answer Ford's Thunderbird and an attempt to improve the automaker's sagging performance.

Designed by Raymond Loewy's team, comprising Tom Kellogg, Bob Andrews, and John Ebstein, on a 40-day crash program, the Avanti featured a radical fiberglass body mounted on a modified Studebaker Lark 109-inch convertible chassis and powered by a modified 289 Hawk V8 engine. A Paxton supercharger was offered as an option.

In eight days, the stylists finished a "clay scale model with two different sides: one a two-place sports car, the other a four-seat GT coupe." Tom Kellogg, a young California stylist hired for this project by Loewy, "felt it should be a four-seat coupe." "Loewy envisioned a low-slung, long-hood–short-deck semi-fastback coupe with a grilleless nose and a wasp-waisted curvature to the rear fenders, suggesting a supersonic aircraft."

The Avanti's complex body shape "would have been both challenging and prohibitively expensive to build in steel" with Studebaker electing to mold the exterior panels in glass-reinforced plastic (fiberglass), outsourcing the work to Molded Fiberglass Body in Ashtabula, Ohio — the same company that built the fiberglass panels for the Chevrolet Corvette in 1953.

The Avanti featured disc brakes in the front that were British Dunlop-designed units, made under license by Bendix, "the first American production model to offer them." The Avanti was one of the first bottom breather designs, where air enters from under the front of the vehicle rather than via a conventional grille above the front bumper. This design feature became much more common after the 1980s.

== Launch ==
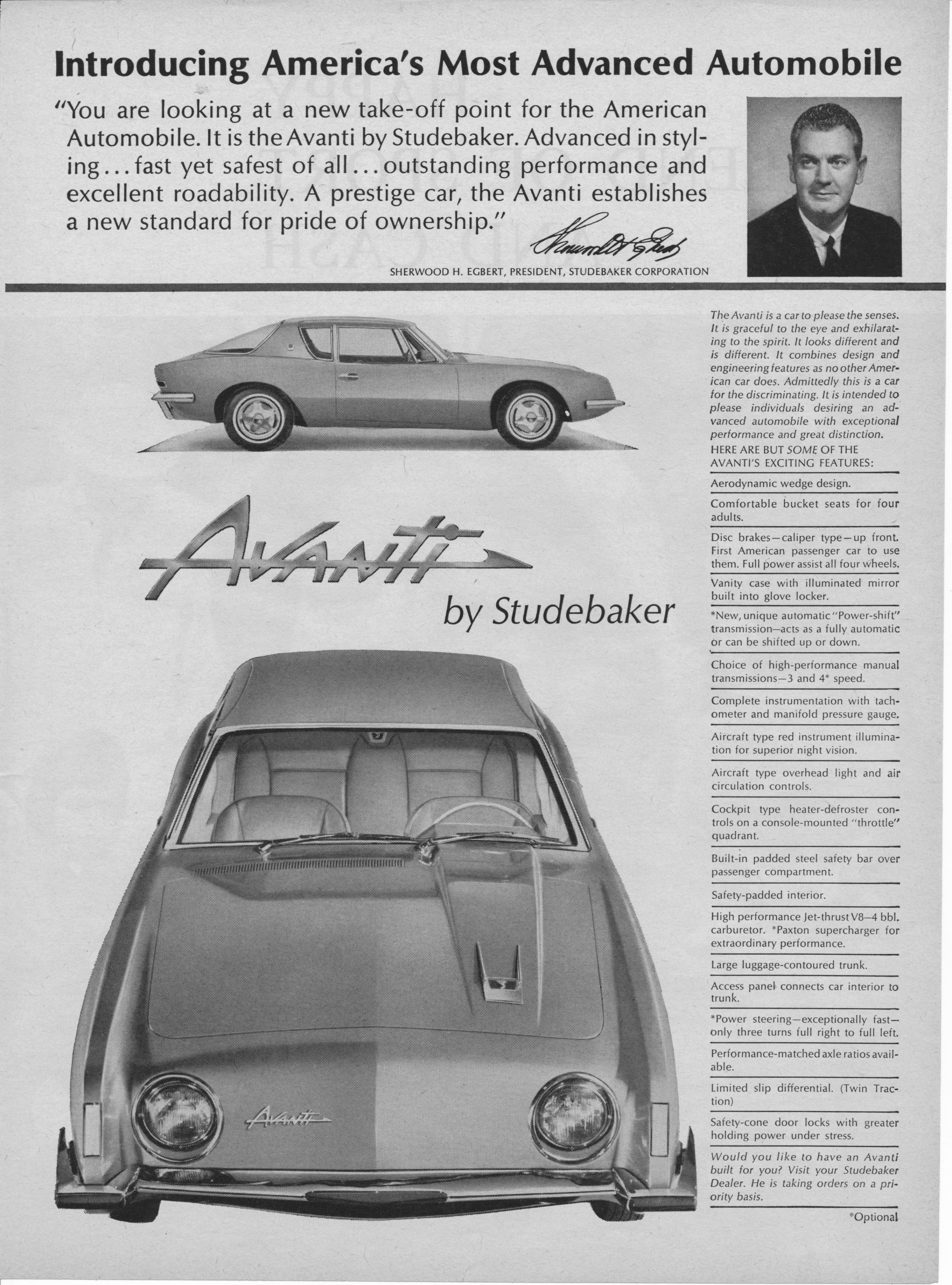
Print ad for launch of Studebaker Avanti featuring CEO Sherwood Egbert

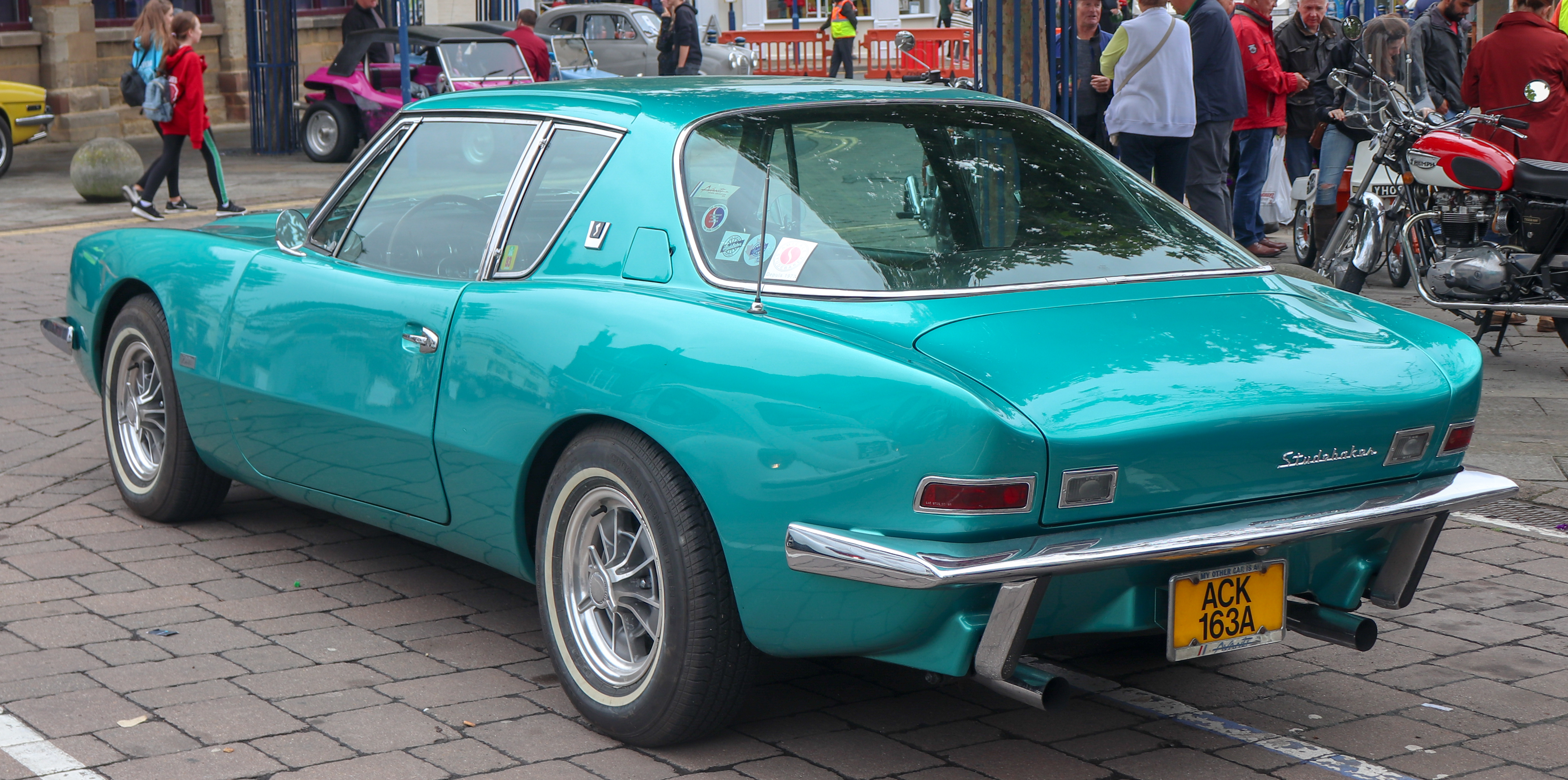
Rear view of an Avanti

The Avanti was publicly introduced on April 26, 1962, "simultaneously at the New York International Automobile Show and at the Annual Shareholders' Meeting." Rodger Ward, winner of the 1962 Indianapolis 500, received a Studebaker Avanti as part of his prize package, "thus becoming the first private owner of an Avanti." A Studebaker Lark convertible was the Indianapolis pace car that year and the Avanti was named the honorary pace car.

In December 1962 the Los Angeles Times reported: "Launching of operations at Studebaker's own fiber-glass body works to increase the production of Avantis." Many production problems concerning the supplier, fit, and finish resulted in delays and cancelled orders.

Egbert planned to sell 20,000 Avantis in 1962, but could build only 1,200.

== End of production ==
After the closure of Studebaker's factory on December 20, 1963, Competition Press reported: "Avantis will no longer be manufactured and contrary to the report that there are thousands gathering dust in South Bend warehouses, Studebaker has only five Avantis left. Dealers have about 2,500, and 1,600 have been sold since its introduction." This contrasted with Chevrolet which produced 23,631 Corvette sports cars in 1963. According to the book My Father The Car written about Stu Chapman, Studebaker Corporation's Advertising & Public Relations Department head in Canada, Studebaker seriously considered reintroducing the Avanti into Studebaker showrooms in 1965/66 after production resumed in 1965 via Studebaker-Packard dealership owners Newman & Altman.

== Succession ==
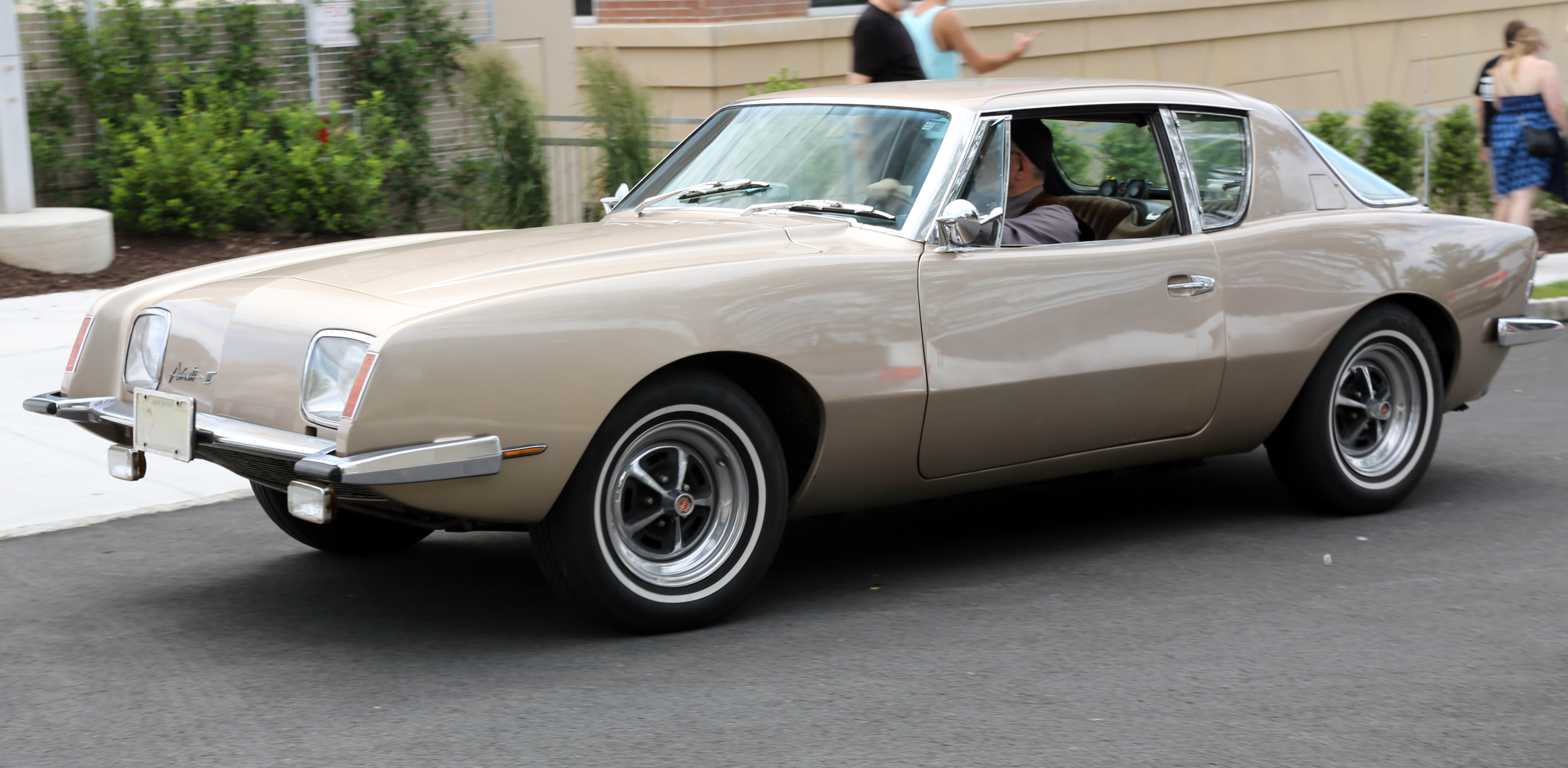
1967 Avanti II

The Avanti name, tooling, and plant space were sold to two South Bend, Indiana, Studebaker dealers, Nate Altman and Leo Newman. They reintroduced a slightly modified hand-built version of the original Avanti using leftover Studebaker chassis and engines from General Motors. There was no connection with the Studebaker brand name.

== Revival ==
Following Altman and Newman's effort, a succession of additional entrepreneurs purchased the tooling and name to manufacture small numbers of increasingly modified variants of the car, including the Avanti II, through 2006.

== Avanti Owners Association ==
The Avanti Owners Association International is an active association with nearly 2,000 members worldwide and meeting yearly in various cities in the United States and in Switzerland. Members of the not-for-profit organization receive the full-color quarterly "Avanti Magazine" publication, published since the organization's founding in 1965.
