= List of women anthologists =

This is a list of women anthologists with Wikipedia pages.

== A ==
- Ama Ata Aidoo (1940–2023)
- Irène Assiba d'Almeida (living)
- Gloria Anzaldúa (1942–2004)
- Claire Armitstead (living)
- Cynthia Asquith (1887–1960)

== B ==
- Toni Cade Bambara (1939–1995)
- Maria Banuș (1914–1999)
- Amina Baraka (born 1942)
- Mildred Barya (living)
- Patricia Bell-Scott (living)
- Carla Blank (living)
- Valerie Bloom (born 1956)
- Jenny Bornholdt (born 1960)
- Carole Boyce Davies (living)
- Dionne Brand (born 1953)
- Rodica Bretin (born 1958)
- Carellin Brooks (living)
- Jane Bryce (born 1951)
- Jean Buffong (born 1943)
- Margaret Busby (born 1944)
- Sarah Shun-lien Bynum (born 1972)

== C ==
- Eliza Lo Chin (born 1967)
- Rohini Chowdhury (born 1963)
- Jennie Thornley Clarke (1860–1924)
- Patricia Hill Collins (born 1948)
- Anne Compton (born 1947)
- Maryse Condé (1934–2024)
- Domitila García Doménico de Coronado (1847–1938)
- Jeni Couzyn (born 1942)
- Patricia Craig (b. 1940s)

== D ==
- Jean D'Costa (born 1937)
- Meri Nana-Ama Danquah (born 1967)
- Ellen Datlow (born 1949)
- Amber Dawn (living)
- Phillippa Yaa de Villiers (born 1966)
- Miriam DeCosta-Willis (1934–2021)
- Babette Deutsch (1895–1982)
- Kay Dick (1915–2001)
- Rosemary Dobson (1920–2012)
- Maura Dooley (born 1957)
- Rita Dove (born 1952)
- Alice Dunbar Nelson (1875–1935)

== E ==
- Mari Evans (1923–2017)
- Bernardine Evaristo (born 1959)

== F ==
- Connie Fife (1961–2017)
- Nikky Finney (born 1957)
- Annie Foulkes (1877–1962)
- Constance Fowler (17th century)
- Jaclyn Friedman (born 1971)

== G ==
- Domitila García de Coronado (1847–1938)
- Helen Gardner (1908–1986)
- Kadija George (also known as Kadija Sesay; b. 1962)
- Roma Gill (1934–2001)
- Daisy Goodwin (born 1961)
- Germaine Greer (born 1939)

== H ==
- Gabrielle Harbowy (born 1972)
- A. Breeze Harper (living)
- Margret Helgadottir (born 1971)
- Camila Henríquez Ureña (1894–1973)
- Nalo Hopkinson (born 1960)
- Akasha Gloria Hull (born 1944)

== I ==
- Lyn Innes (born 1940)

== J ==
- Delia Jarrett-Macauley (living)
- Salma Khadra Jayyusi (1926/1927–2023)
- June Jordan (1936–2002)

== K ==
- Joan Kahn (1914–1994)
- Jean Kent (born 1951)
- Naseem Khan (1939–2017)

== L ==
- Sylvie Le Bon-de Beauvoir (born 1941)
- Kathleen Lines (1902–1988)
- Flora E. Lowry (1879–1933)

== M ==
- Lindiwe Mabuza (1938–2021)
- Margaret Mayo (born 1935)
- Anne Mazer (born 1953)
- Karen McCarthy Woolf (born 1966)
- Terry McMillan (born 1951)
- Cherríe Moraga (born 1952)
- Pamela Mordecai (born 1942)
- Robin Morgan (1941–2026)
- Toni Morrison (1931–2019)

== P ==
- Lizabeth Paravisini-Gebert (born 1953)
- Polly Pattullo (living)
- Velma Pollard (1937–2025)
- Rosey E. Pool (1905–1971)
- Dorothy B. Porter (1905–1995)

== Q ==
- Christine Qunta (born 1952)

== R ==
- Catherine Reilly (1925–2005)
- Soledad Reyes (born 1946)
- Maria Riddell (1772–1808)
- Jessie Belle Rittenhouse (1869–1948)
- Marsha Rowe (born 1944)
- Penelope Rowlands (living)

== S ==
- Nina Salaman (1877–1925)
- Claudia Salazar Jiménez (born 1976)
- Elaine Salo (1962–2016)
- Sonia Sanchez (born 1934)
- Mandy Sayer (born 1963)
- Libby Scheier (1946–2000)
- Nana Darkoa Sekyiamah (living)
- Zena Sharman (living)
- Dorothy Sheridan (born 1948)
- Josepha Sherman (1946–2012)
- Barbara Smith (born 1946)
- Caro Soles (living)
- Dale Spender (1943–2023)
- Irene Staunton (living)
- Adelle Stripe (born 1976)
- Arundhathi Subramaniam (born 1973)
- Rosemary Sullivan (born 1947)

== T ==
- Eileen Tabios (born 1960)
- Claudia Tate (1947–2002)
- Mary Wilder Tileston (1843–1934)
- Janet Todd (born 1942)
- Deborah Treisman (born 1970)

== V ==
- Jessica Valenti (born 1978)
- Yvonne Vera (1964–2005)
- Eugenia Viteri (1928–2023)

== W ==
- Ellah Wakatama (born 1966)
- Anne Walmsley (1931–2025)
- Michelene Wandor (born 1940)
- Zukiswa Wanner (born 1976)
- Mary Helen Washington (born 1941)
- Carolyn Wells (1862–1942)
- Louise Collier Willcox (1865–1929)
- Amabel Williams-Ellis (1894–1984)
- Liliane Wouters (1930–2016)

== X ==
- Makhosazana Xaba (born 1957)
