= Buffong =

Buffong is a surname. Notable people with the surname include:

- Jean Buffong (born 1943), Grenadian-British writer
- Michael Buffong (born 1964), English theatre director
