= Margaret Mayo =

Margaret Mayo may refer to:

- Margaret Mayo (playwright) (1882–1951), American playwright and actress
- Margaret Mayo (children's author) (born 1935), English children's literature and folktales writer
- Margaret Mayo (novelist) (born 1936), English romance novelist
