= Carmel Snow =

Irish journalist

- Born: Carmel White; 21 August 1887; Dalkey, Ireland
- Died: 7 May 1961 (aged 73); New York City, U.S.
- Occupation: Magazine editor
- Employer(s): Vogue, Harper's Bazaar

Carmel Snow (born Carmel White; 21 August 1887 – 7 May 1961) was the editor-in-chief of the American edition of Harper's Bazaar from 1934 to 1958; and the chair of the magazine's editorial board. She was famously quoted as saying, "Elegance is good taste, plus a dash of daring".

== Biography ==
=== Early life ===
She was born in St Justin's, Dalkey, Dublin, Ireland to Peter White, a merchant tailor, and Annie Meyne. After her father's death from pneumonia on April 7, 1893, she and her mother Annie moved to America. Her mother eventually became a noted dressmaker for wealthy New York socialites.

In 1903, Carmel attended school at a convent in Brussels; the Soeurs de Sainte-Marie is where she mastered her understanding of French.

=== Career ===
In 1921 she was introduced to Vogue editor Edna Woolman Chase by Anne Rittenhouse, for whom she had done a favor; Condé Nast subsequently offered her the job of assistant fashion editor.

In 1926 she was appointed as fashion editor at Vogue. Also in 1926, she married George Palen Snow, while wearing a gown of cream white satin trimmed with seed pearls and old Burano lace that had been in her family for many years. She later had three daughters; it was rumored that one of them had schizophrenia, but this diagnosis has not been confirmed.

In 1929 her brother Tom White became general manager of the Hearst publishing organization. Though Carmel had promised Condé Nast she would not take a job there, she ultimately did take a job at Harper's Bazaar. In 1932 Carmel became the fashion editor of Harper's Bazaar. She famously described her goal at Harper's Bazaar as creating a magazine for "well-dressed women with well-dressed minds".

She discovered Martin Munkacsi, and in 1933 persuaded him to photograph the Harper's Bazaar December edition's 'Palm Beach' bathing suit editorial. For this editorial, he had the model Lucille Brokaw run toward the camera while he photographed, which was the first instance of a fashion model being photographed in motion.

She became editor-in-chief of Harper's Bazaar in 1934.

She hired her art director Alexey Brodovitch based on a 1934 exhibition of his work in graphic design at the Art Directors Club of New York. She described his exhibit as a revelation, mentioning "pages that bled beautifully, cropped photographs, typography and design that were bold and interesting". She found her fashion editor, Diana Vreeland, after noticing her dancing across a crowded room.

In 1947 she exclaimed, "It's such a new look!" or "Your dresses have such a new look!", thus coining that phrase regarding Christian Dior's 1947 collection.

Snow died in 1961, while she was working with her long-time collaborator Mary Louis Aswell on her memoir, The World of Carmel Snow. The book was published posthumously.

== Legacy ==
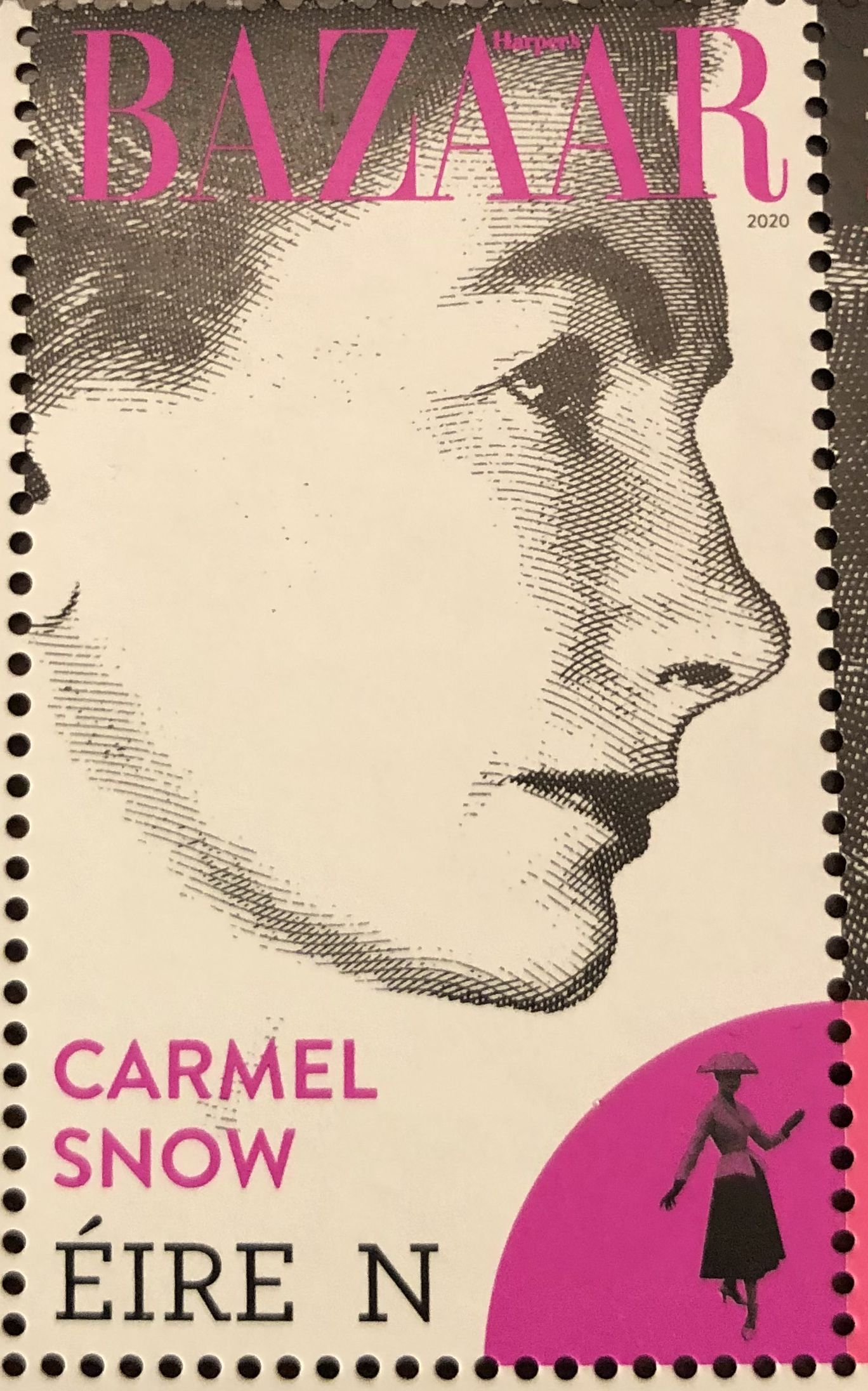
Carmel Snow commemorative stamp 2020

As to why Carmel's reputation faded, while Vreeland's did not, photographer Richard Avedon (quoted in a 2005 biography of Carmel by Penelope Rowlands) said: "She was older, right? and she died before stardom was the thing."

In 2020, Snow was one of a number of famous Irish people featured on stamps by An Post.

== Portrayal ==
She was portrayed by Glenn Close in the television series The New Look.
