= Helen Dryden =

American artist (1882–1972)

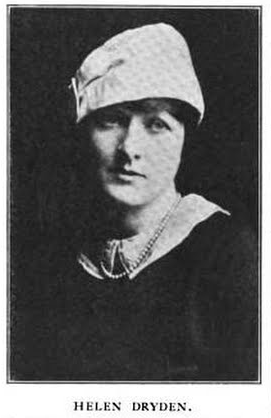
- Born: November 26, 1882; Baltimore, Maryland
- Died: October 1972 (aged 89); Brentwood, New York

Signature
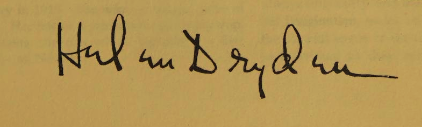

Helen Dryden (5 November 1882 – 1972) was an American artist and industrial designer in the 1920s and 1930s. She was reportedly described by The New York Times as being the highest-paid woman artist in the United States, though she lived in comparative poverty in later years.

== Education ==
Dryden was born in Baltimore to a wealthy family that lived near the Washington Monument. Her future as a socialite changed when the family encountered a "break-down of a sugar refining business." The family moved to Pittsburgh and she attended Eden Hall when she was seven. Then she moved to Mrs. Comegys School. During her early childhood years, Dryden showed unusual artistic ability, designing and selling clothes for paper dolls. As part of a school project, she made a collection of paper dolls and dresses, which became a feature in a newspaper's fashion section. It was an opportunity that led to a position as an illustrator for Anne Rittenhouse's fashion articles in the Philadelphia Public Ledger and Philadelphia Press.

Dryden was primarily self-trained, describing her works as "a combination of things I like, in the way I want to do them." Her artistic education consisted of four years of training in landscape painting under Hugh Breckinridge and one summer school session at the Pennsylvania Academy of Fine Arts. Deciding that she had no genuine interest in landscape painting, Dryden focused entirely on fashion design and illustration.

== Career ==
=== Fashion illustration ===
After moving to New York in 1909, Dryden spent a year trying to interest fashion magazines in her drawings. None, however, showed any interest in her work, and many were harshly critical. Dryden was particularly disappointed in her rejection by Vogue. Less than a year later, however, Condé Nast Publications assumed management of Vogue and set out to make changes. Upon seeing Dryden's drawings, they directed the fashion editor to contact her immediately. The result was a Vogue contract that led to a 13-year collaboration (1909–1922) during which she produced many fashion illustrations and magazine covers. Her "essentially romantic style produced some of the most appealing, yet fantastical images on Vogue covers, frequently depicting imagined rather than realistic representations of dress." She also illustrated other Condé Nast titles, including Vanity Fair and House and Garden. This was Dryden’s "most prolific working period" and her inspiration is also often associated with the start of Art Deco" with "has graceful, feminine forms" showing "whimsical, imaginative, and notably decorative illustrations of full figures." Dryden stopped working for Vogue in mid-1923 and began designing wallpaper patterns and illustrated advertisements for companies making dress fabrics, towels, and hats. In the late 1920s, Dryden designed the covers for the fashion and dressmaking magazine The Delineator characterized by streamlined cubist forms as a "reflection of modernity and industry."

=== Costume design ===
In addition to her prolific career as an illustrator, in 1914, Dryden launched a successful career as a costume designer. She designed scenery and costumes for the musical comedy Watch Your Step, followed by designs for several other stage plays, including Clair de Lune, the fanciful drama based loosely on a Victor Hugo romance. Although the play starred Lionel and Ethel Barrymore, Helen Dryden's costume designs were generally given equal credit for the play's success.

=== Industrial design ===
Following the 1925 Paris Exposition Internationale des Arts Décoratifs et Industriels Modernes, Dryden turned her attention to industrial design, producing many designs for tableware, lamps, and other housewares for the Revere Corporation. She had a highly paid job with the Dura Company until the stock market crash of 1929. At this point, she was replaced by George W. Walker. It seems Dryden never fully recovered from this blow. Christopher Gray wrote, "The 1925 census recorded her living at 9 East 10th Street with her 25-year-old Philippine-born cook and butler, Ricardo Lampitok."

Dryden worked for Studebaker from 1935 to 1938, reportedly earning $100,000 per year ($2,287,234 in 2025 dollars). Automotive designer Raymond Loewy contracted with her to help him design Studebaker interiors. Her work on the interior of the 1936 Studebaker Dictator and President that established Helen Dryden as an important twentieth-century industrial designer. The advertisements by the automaker proclaimed, "It's styled by Helen Dryden." Dryden designed the Studebaker President throughout, and the press marveled that a woman had attained this eminence in mechanical engineering. Studebaker described the interior of the 1937 cars as "refreshingly ventilated and generously roomy, …tastefully and distinctively styled by famous Helen Dryden, America's "first lady" of design." Similar advertisements mentioning Helen Dryden by name appeared in popular magazines and many newspapers, an unusual effort "to publicize a specific designer, especially a woman, in car advertising" at that time. She was considered "one of the top industrial designers and one of the few women in the automotive field." Dryden worked with Loewy through 1940.

== Legacy ==
After 1940, Dryden's career faded mysteriously and vanished from the public eye. Her story turned to her living on welfare in an East Village hotel in New York City. By 1956, Dryden was again living in a $10-a-week hotel room paid for by the city's Welfare Department. At the time, she referred nostalgically to "her '$200-a-month' 10th Street apartment". She went through involuntary commitment in 1955 to the Pilgrim State Hospital in Brentwood, New York, where she died in October 1972.

Dryden "has faded into obscurity and anonymity in the fast-paced modern world." Her groundbreaking achievements have not been recognized.
