= Studebaker Golden Hawk =

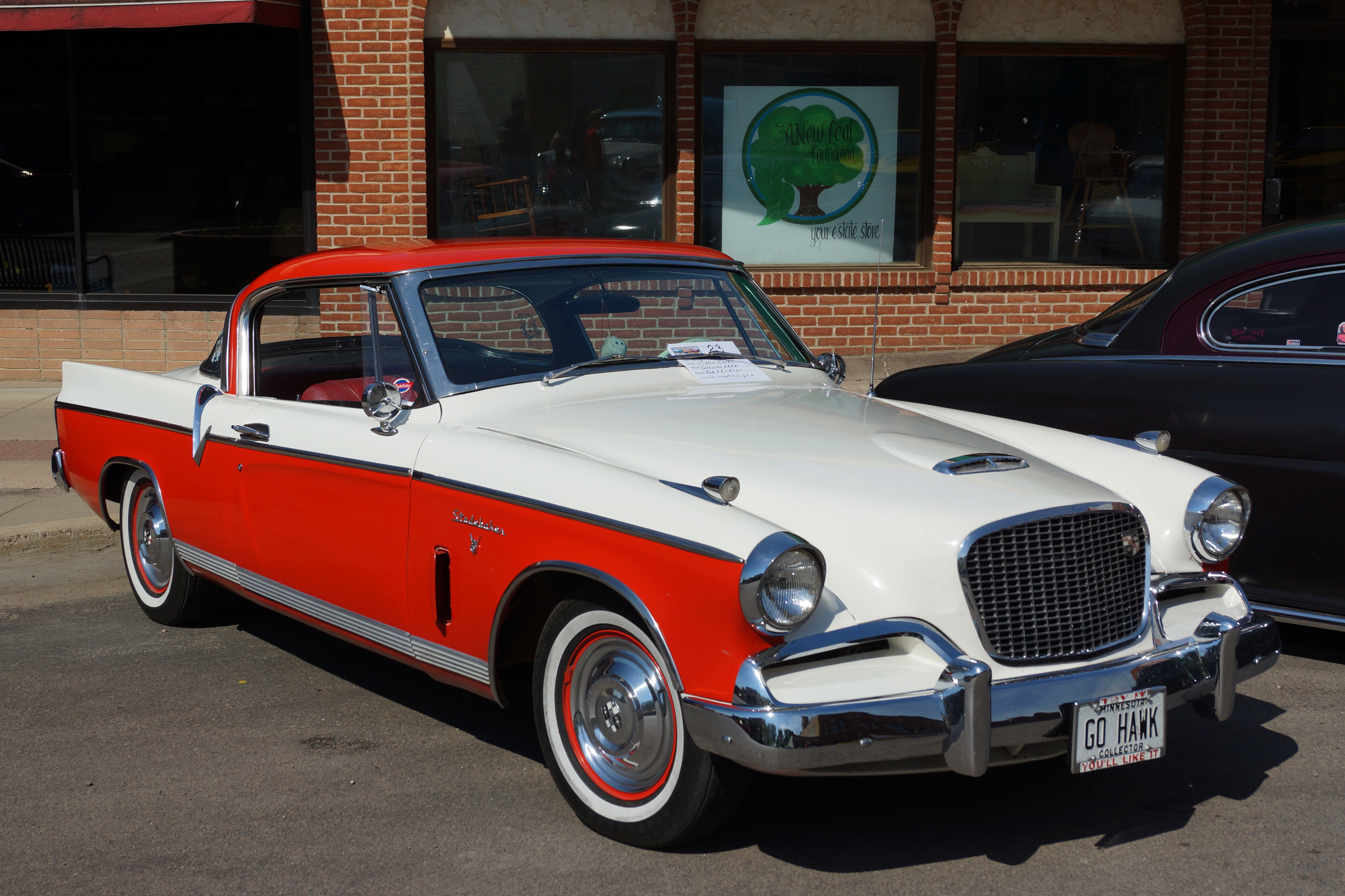
- 1956 Studebaker Golden Hawk

Overview
- Manufacturer: Studebaker
- Assembly: Studebaker Automotive Plant, South Bend, Indiana, United States; Studebaker Canada, Hamilton, Ontario, Canada

Body and chassis
- Body style: 2-door hardtop
- Layout: FR layout

The Studebaker Golden Hawk is a two-door pillarless hardtop personal luxury car produced by the Studebaker Corporation of South Bend, Indiana, between 1956 and 1958.

== Styling ==
The last automobile until the Avanti to have styling influenced by industrial designer Raymond Loewy's studio, the Golden Hawk took the basic shape of the 1953–55 Champion/Commander Starliner hardtop coupe but added a large, almost vertical eggcrate grille and raised hoodline in place of the earlier car's swooping, pointed nose, and was introduced as the Studebaker Speedster. At the rear, a raised, squared-off trunklid replaced the earlier sloped lid, and vertical fiberglass tailfins were added to the rear quarters. The Golden Hawk was two inches shorter than the standard Hawk at 153.6 inches.

== Power ==
The raised hood and grille were added to allow space for a larger engine, Packard's 352 in³ (5.8 L) V8, which delivered 275 bhp (205 kW). This comparatively large, powerful engine in such a light car gave the Golden Hawk an excellent power-to-weight ratio (and thus performance) for the time; of 1956 American production cars, the Golden Hawk was second only to Chrysler's 300B by that measure — and the Chrysler, which cost considerably more, was essentially a road-legal NASCAR racing car. The Golden Hawk, like the Chryslers, is a precursor to the muscle cars of the 1960s.

The heavy engine gave the car a reputation for being nose-heavy; the supercharged Studebaker engine that replaced the Packard engine in 1957 was heavier. Road tests of the time, many of which were conducted by racing drivers, seldom mentioned any handling issues in spite of the heavy front end. Speed Age magazine of July 1956 tested the Golden Hawk against the Chrysler 300B, Ford Thunderbird, and Chevrolet Corvette, finding that the Golden Hawk could out-perform the others comfortably in both 0-60 mph acceleration and quarter mile times. The fastest 0-60 reported in magazine testing was 7.8 seconds, while top speeds were quoted as 125 mph (201 km/h) plus. The 1956 model powered by a Packard engine entered the famous Mille Miglia race in Italy.

== Options ==
A wide variety of colors (including two-tone paint schemes) were available. Two-tone schemes initially involved the front upper body, the roof, and a panel on the tail being painted the contrast color, with the rest of the body in the base color. Later 1956 production had the body above the body trim line, including the trunk, in the contrast color with the tail panel, roof, and the body below the body trim line being in the base color. The interior included an engine turned dash.

An increased options list and reduced standard equipment were used to keep base price down compared to the previous year's Studebaker Speedster, which the Golden Hawk replaced. Even turn signals were an option.

The Golden Hawk was matched with three other Hawk models for 1956, and was the only Hawk not technically considered a sub-model within one of Studebaker's regular passenger car lines; the Flight Hawk coupe was a Champion, the Power Hawk coupe was a Commander, and the Sky Hawk hardtop was a President.

== 1957–1958: The Golden Hawk ==
The Golden Hawk was continued for the 1957 and 1958 model years, but with some changes. Packard's Utica, Michigan, engine plant was leased to Curtiss-Wright during 1956 (and eventually sold to them), marking the end of genuine Packard production. Packard-badged cars were produced for two more years, but they were essentially rebadged Studebakers, including Packard Hawk – the restyled Golden Hawk. The Packard V8, introduced only two years earlier, was therefore no longer available. It was replaced with the Studebaker 289 in³ (4.7 L) V8 with the addition of a McCulloch supercharger, giving the same 275 hp (205 kW) output as the Packard engine. This improved the car's top speed, making these the best-performing Hawks until the Gran Turismo Hawk became available with the Avanti's R2 supercharged engine for the 1963 model year.

The Golden Hawks were 203.9 inches (5,180 mm) long. A padded dash was standard.

Styling also changed somewhat. A fiberglass overlay on the hood was added, which covered a hole in the hood that was needed to clear the supercharger, which was mounted high on the front of the engine. The tailfins, now made of metal, were concave and swept out from the sides of the car. The fins were outlined in chrome trim and normally were painted a contrasting color, although some solid-color Golden Hawks were built.

Halfway through the 1957 model year, a luxury 400 model was introduced, featuring a leather interior, a fully upholstered trunk, and special trim. Only 41 of these special cars were produced, and very few of the 41 exist today. One of them, the first production model, is housed at the Studebaker Museum in South Bend.

For 1958, the Golden Hawk switched to 14-inch wheels instead of 15-inch wheels, making the car ride a little lower. The 15-inch wheels, however, were available as an option. Other styling changes included a new, round Hawk medallion mounted in the lower center of the grille, and the available contrasting-color paint was now applied to both the roof and tailfins. One unique feature was a vacuum gauge on the instrument panel. Padded dash boards were standard.

Several minor engineering changes were made for '58, including revisions to the suspension and driveshaft that finally allowed designers to create a three-passenger rear seat. Earlier models had seating for only two passengers in the rear because the high driveshaft "hump" necessitated dividing the seat; a fixed arm rest (later made removable because of customer requests) was placed between the rear passengers in earlier models.

In January 2011, Barrett-Jackson auctions sold a 1957 Studebaker Hawk for a final hammer price of $99,000.

== Discontinuation ==
Like many more expensive cars, Golden Hawk sales were heavily hit by the late-1950s recession, and the model was discontinued after only selling 878 examples in 1958. The Silver Hawk remained the only Hawk model; it was renamed simply the Studebaker Hawk for the 1960 model year.

== Gallery ==
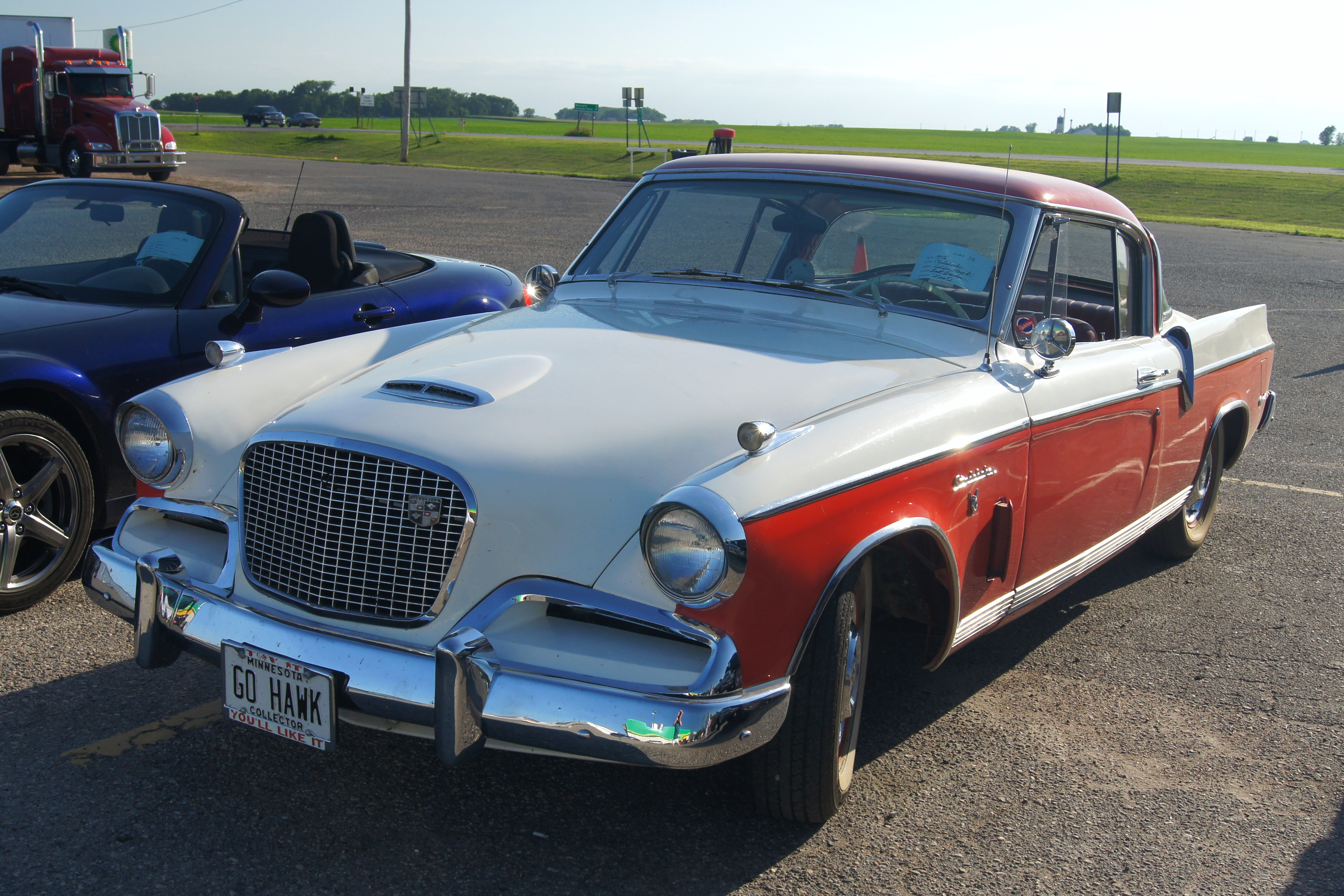
1956 Studebaker Golden Hawk

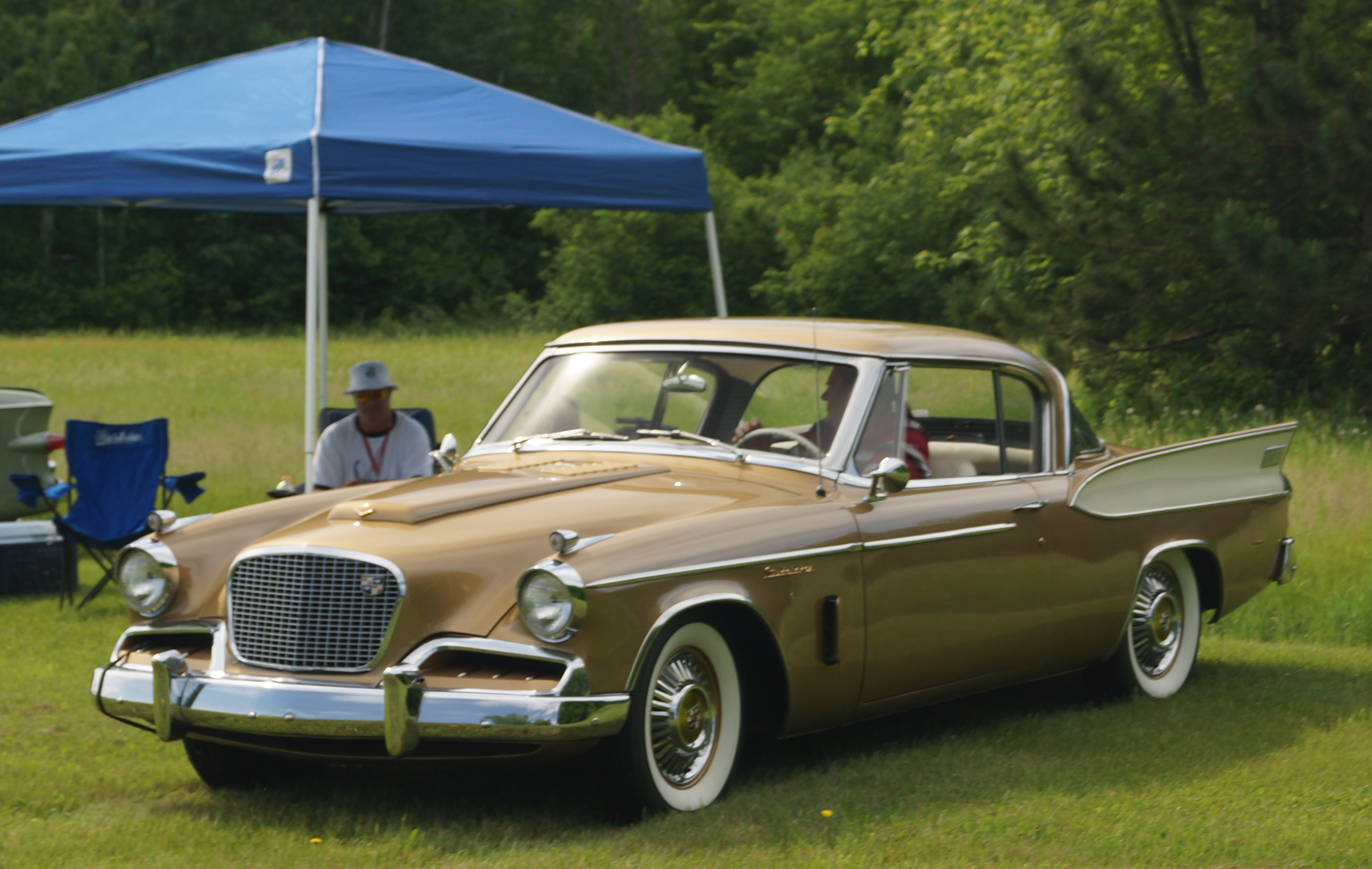
1957 Studebaker Golden Hawk

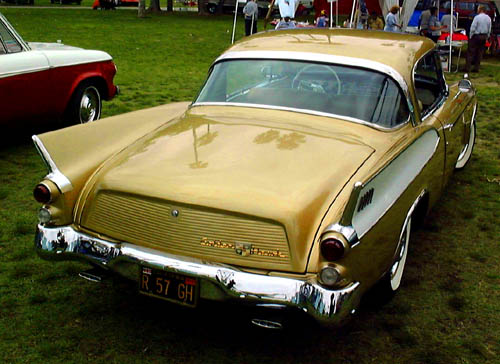
1957 Studebaker Golden Hawk tailfins

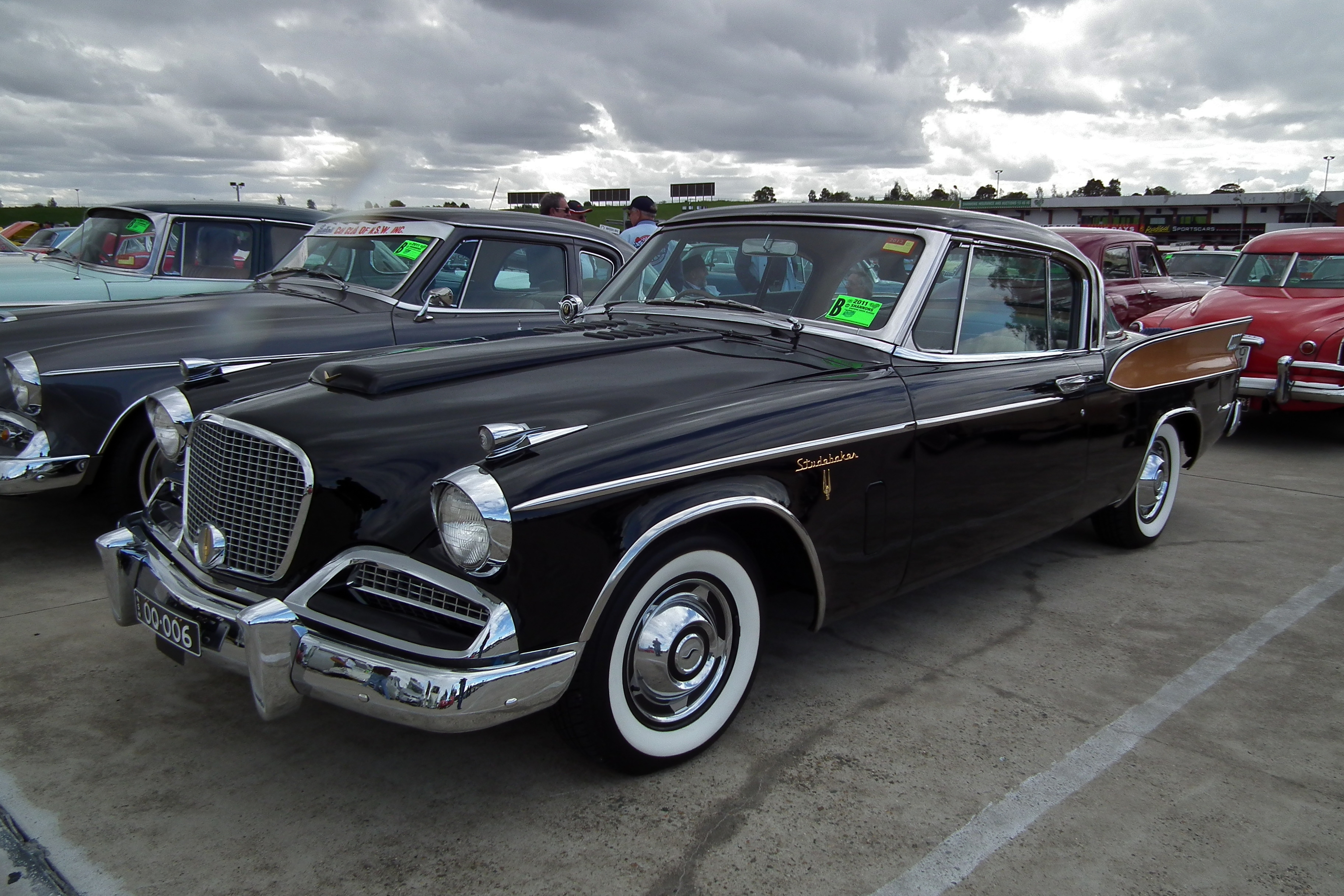
1958 Studebaker Golden Hawk
