= Studebaker Speedster =

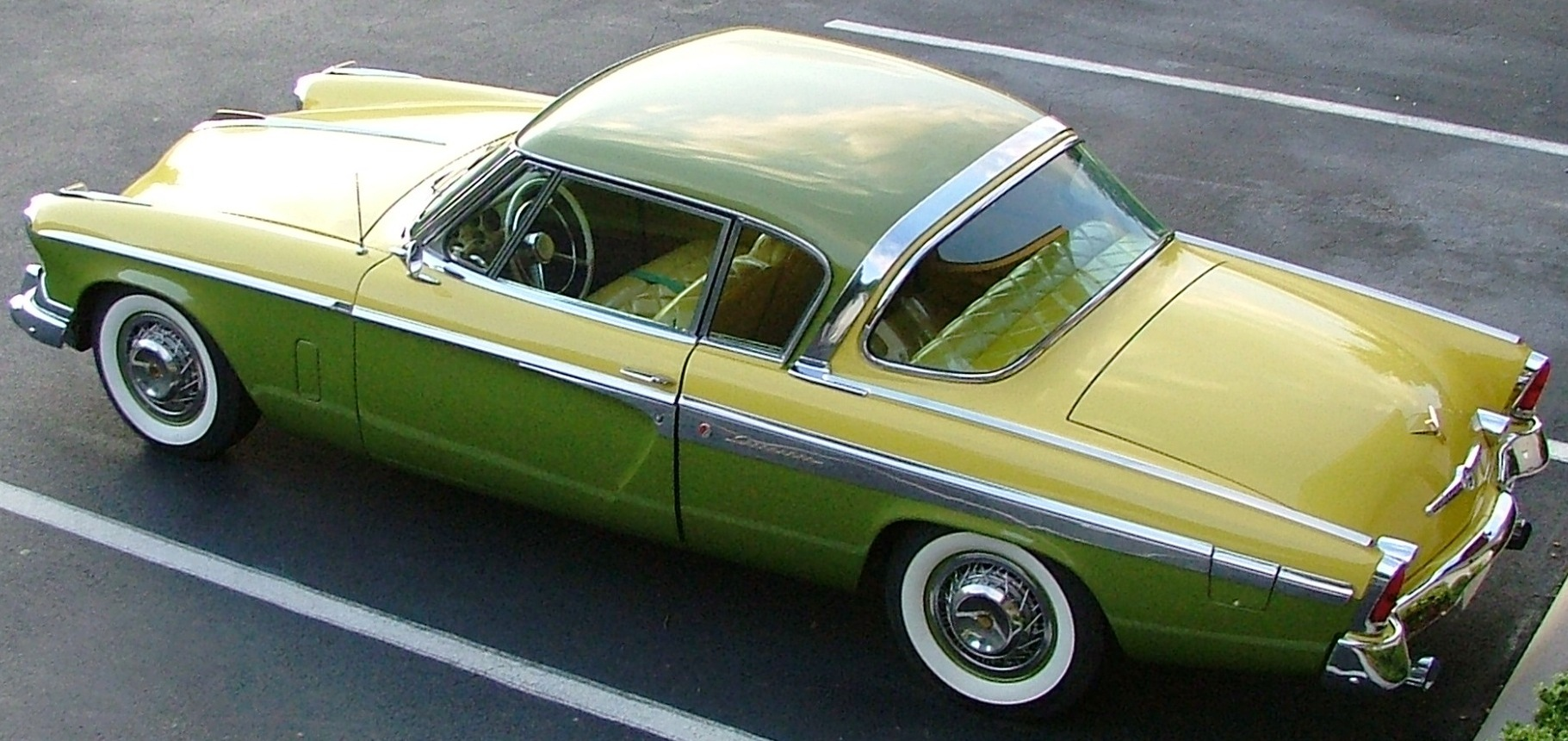

Overview
- Manufacturer: Studebaker
- Model years: 1955
- Assembly: Studebaker Automotive Plant, South Bend, Indiana, United States

Body and chassis
- Class: Personal luxury car
- Body style: 2-door hardtop coupé
- Platform: Studebaker President
- Related: Studebaker President

Powertrain
- Engine: 259 cu in (4.2 L) V8
- Transmission: 3-speed Borg-Warner manual; 3-speed Borg-Warner DG250 automatic

Dimensions
- Wheelbase: 120.5 in (3,061 mm)
- Length: 204.4 in (5,192 mm)
- Width: 70.4 in (1,788 mm)
- Height: 56.3 in (1,430 mm)
- Curb weight: 3,301 lb (1,497 kg)

Chronology
- Predecessor: Studebaker Champion Starliner
- Successor: Studebaker Golden Hawk

The Studebaker Speedster was an automobile produced by the Studebaker Corporation of South Bend, Indiana during the 1955 model year. The vehicle was considered Studebaker's halo model for the 1955 season. Studebaker had previously used the Speedster name in the early 1920s, and was a marketing strategy revival of the President during that time.

== Description ==
The Speedster was a member of the President series, and was based on President hardtop coupe. For 1955, the company heavily restyled its models to incorporate a larger front bumper and a massive chrome grille more in keeping with American cars of the era.

An initial run of twenty Speedsters was made to be displayed at car shows for the 1955 model year. Reaction to the show cars caused Studebaker's management to put the car into production mid-year and offer it for the rest of the model year, after which it was replaced by the previously planned Hawk series. It allowed the company to offer a competitor to the Ford Thunderbird and Chrysler 300.

Power came from Studebaker's 259 cu in (4.2 L) V8 engine producing 185 horsepower (138 kW) and 258 pound-feet (350 N⋅m) of torque.

== Features ==
The Speedster's list price started at $3,346, ($39,275 in 2024 dollars) or about $800 more than a base 1955 President State hardtop. The reason was the 1955 President Speedster was loaded with standard equipment including: choice of Studebaker Automatic Drive or overdrive transmissions, power steering, power brakes, four-barrel carburetor, dual exhaust, "Shoemaker-stitched" diamond-quilted genuine top-grain leather seating, carpeting front and rear, a map pocket (but no glove box) an eight-tube push-button radio, a machine turned instrument panel with a Stewart-Warner 160 mph (260 km/h) speedometer and an 8,000 rpm tachometer, turn signals, electric clock, tinted glass, cigarette lighter, oil filter and oil bath air cleaner, dual backup lamps, triple horns, two-speed electric wipers, tubeless whitewall tires, simulated wire wheel covers and fog-light bumperettes.

There was also Speedster-specific trim including a hood-length hood ornament, stainless roof band, Speedster nameplates and checkered emblems as well as chrome-plated ashtrays, rear-view mirror, moldings and tailpipe extensions. They also came in 2- and 3-tone paint jobs, the most famous of which was Hialeah Green & Sun Valley Yellow, called "lemon/lime" by the public. The green was a gold flake metallic.

Studebaker produced 2,215 Speedsters during the 1955 model year.

== Bibliography ==
- Bonsall, Thomas E. (2000). "The Packard Operation". More Than They Promised: The Studebaker Story. Stanford, CA US: Stanford University Press. pp. 277–312. ISBN 0-8047-3586-7. LCCN 00-063564.
- Ebert, Roger R. (2013). "2. Erskines, Rocknes, Champions, Weasels and Merger". Champion of the Lark: Harold E. Churchill and the Presidency of Studebaker-Packard, 1956-1961. Jefferson, NC US: McFarland. p. 25. ISBN 978-0-7864-7420-2.
- Koch, Jeff (March 2006). "1955 Studebaker President Speedster". Hemmings. American City Business Journals. Archived from the original on 29 July 2012.
- Lyons, Dan (2005). "1955 Studebaker President Speedster". Cars of the Fantastic '50s. Iola, WI US: KP Books. pp. 89–91. ISBN 0873499263. LCCN 2004116450.
