= Studebaker Land Cruiser =

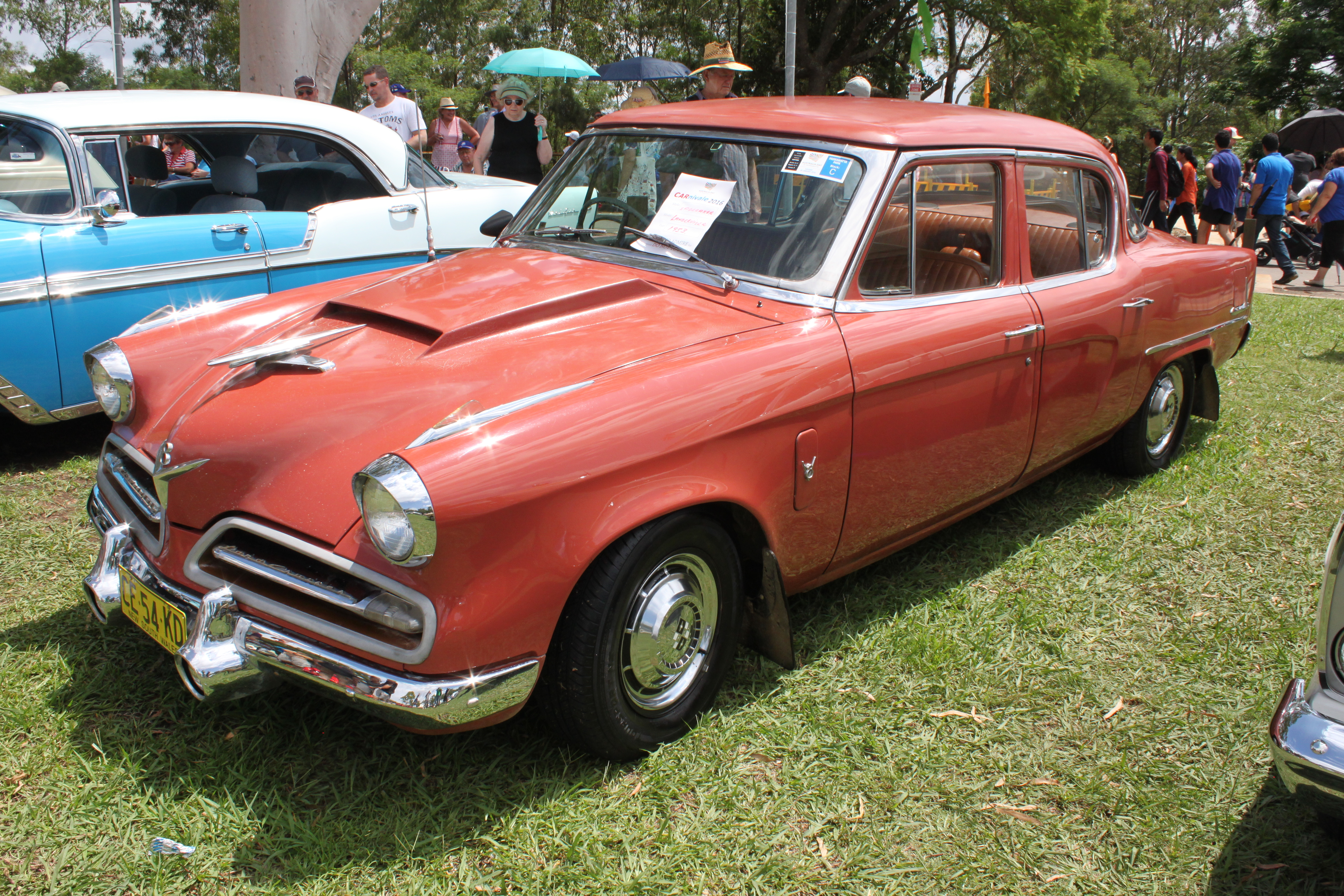
- 1953 Studebaker Land Cruiser

Overview
- Manufacturer: Studebaker
- Production: 1933–1954
- Assembly: Studebaker Automotive Plant, South Bend, Indiana, United States; Studebaker Automotive Plant, Vernon, California, United States

The Studebaker Land Cruiser is an automobile that was produced by the Studebaker Corporation of South Bend, Indiana (United States) from 1934 to 1954. The Land Cruiser debuted at the World's Fair alongside the Silver Arrow, a product of Studebaker's former premium make Pierce-Arrow. It was also manufactured in Vernon, California.

== 1933–1942 ==
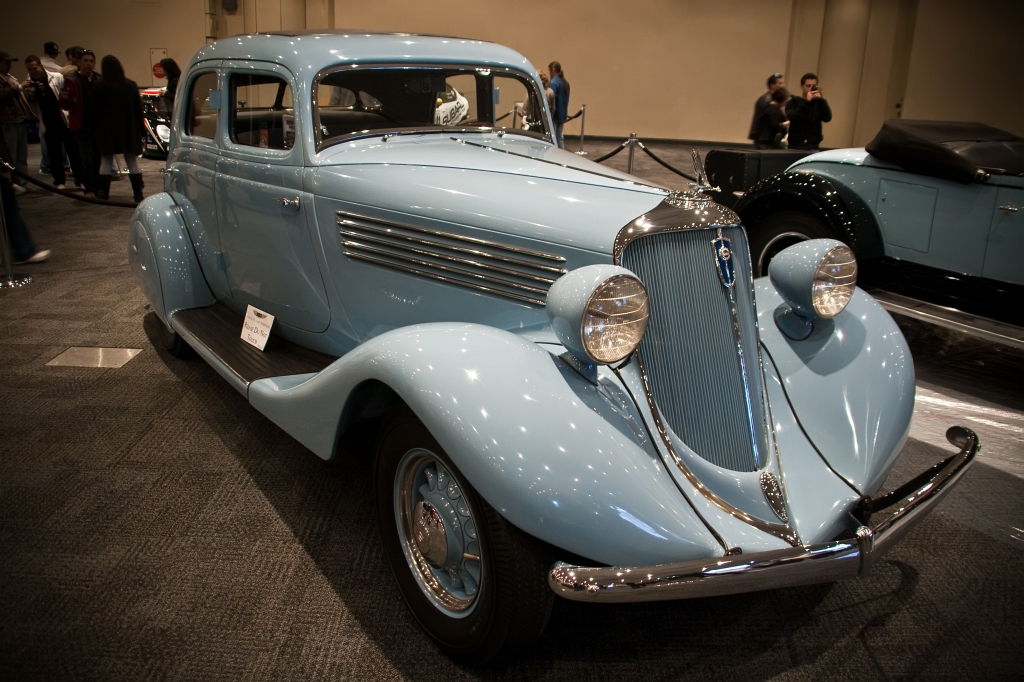
1934 Land Cruiser

The Land Cruiser was introduced at the 1933 Chicago World's Fair as an extensively streamlined sedan. Many of the same aerodynamic features of the car were shared with Pierce-Arrow's Silver Arrow show car that also debuted at the fair when Studebaker assumed operations of Pierce-Arrow in 1928. Work on both automobiles was authorized prior to the company being placed in receivership in March 1933, and Pierce being sold to investors.

Production Land Cruisers began to appear in dealer showrooms in the fall of 1933 as 1934 models. The Land Cruiser was designated as a body style, and classified in the President model range (C Series) for the year. It retailed for $1,510.

The body style was shared with the President and Commander series for 1936. From 1937–1940, the car was classified as the Commander Cruiser and President Cruiser. The Land Cruiser name officially returned in 1941 and 1942. In addition to offering its Land Cruisers in the Commander and President lines, for 1941 Studebaker introduced the ultra-luxurious Skyway Land Cruiser which featured a slightly curved single-pane windshield, rear fender skirts and premium details and fabrics.

== 1947–1952 models ==
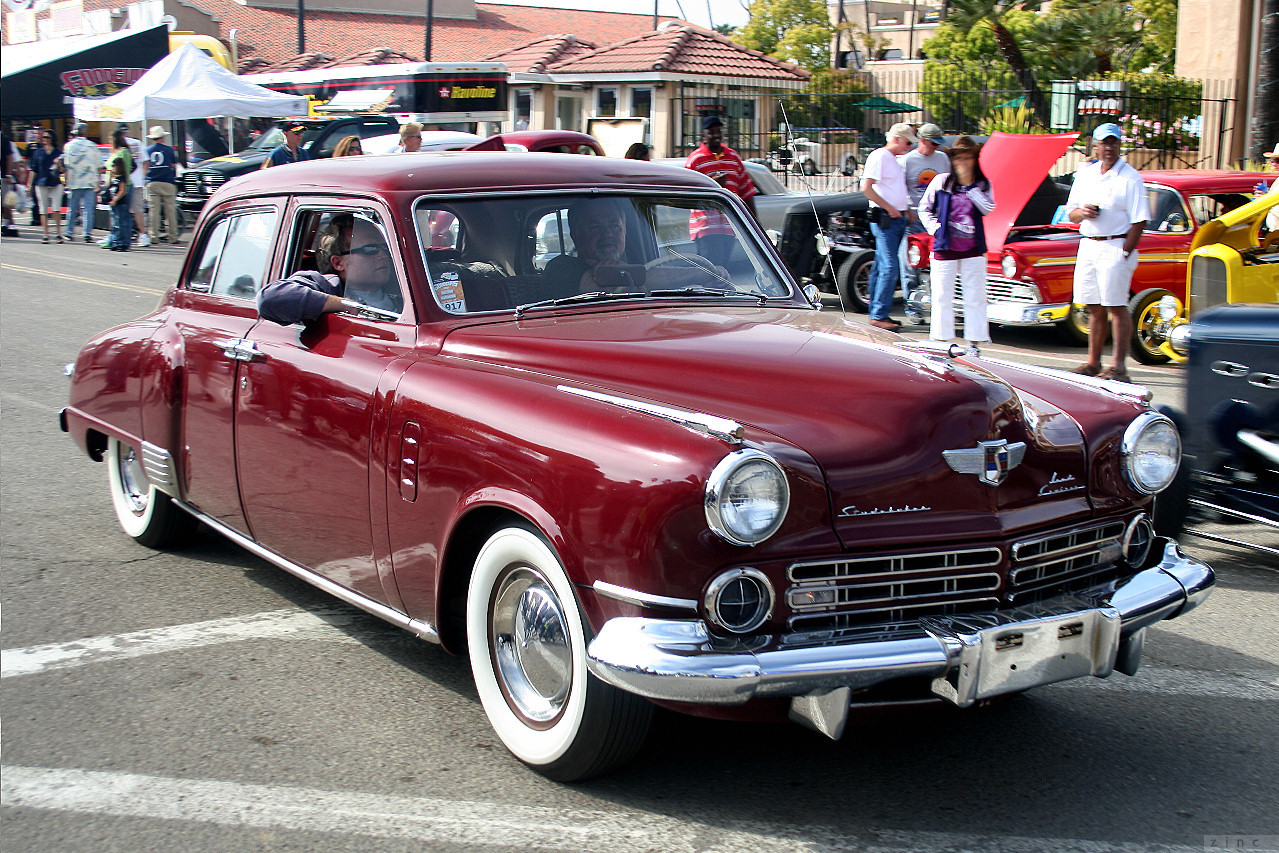
1947 Land Cruiser

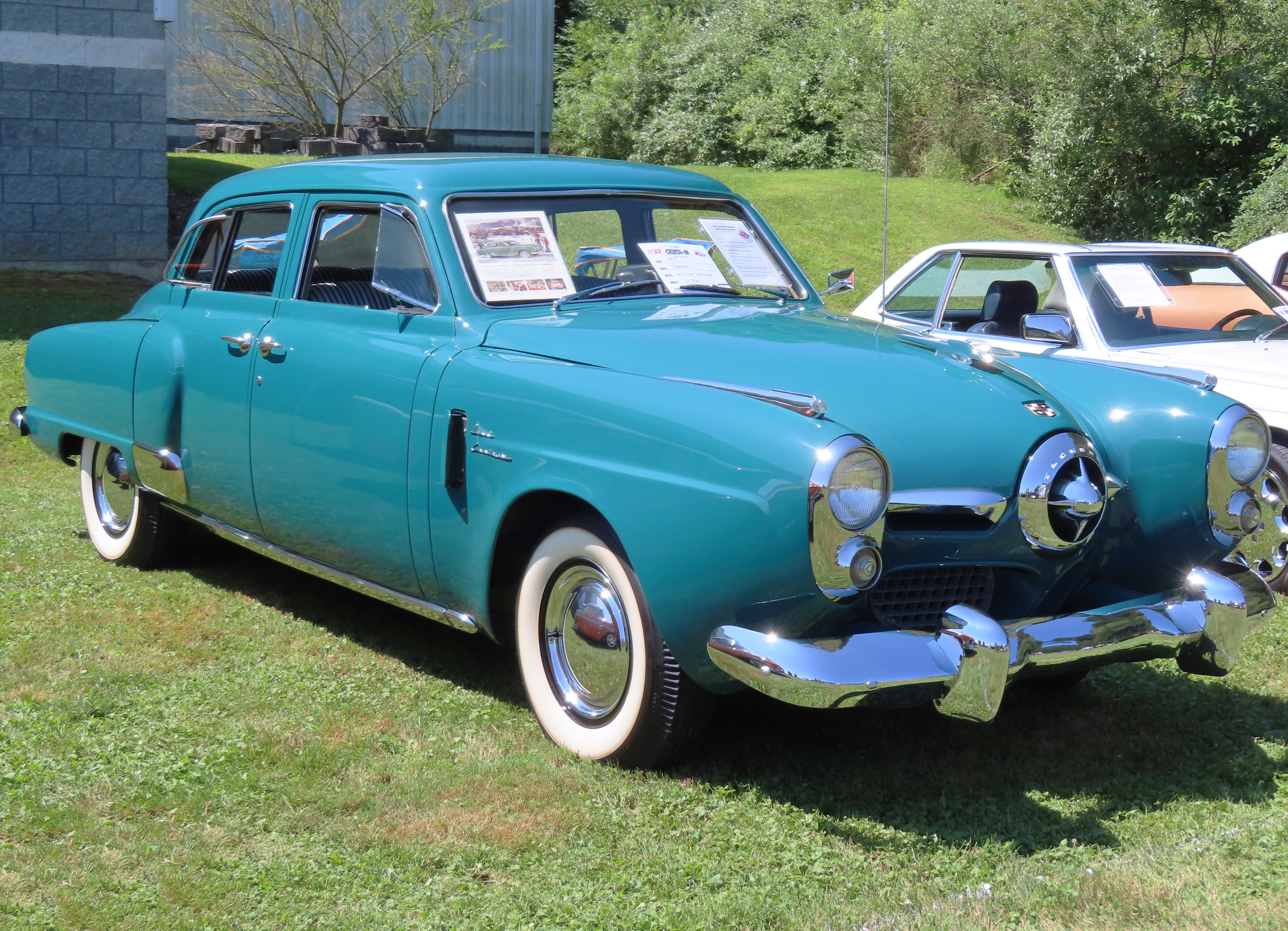
1950 Studebaker Regal De Luxe Land Cruiser

The 1947 Studebaker models were so revolutionary that it had other car builders scurrying back to their drawing boards. While other manufacturers settled for re-chroming their pre-war models, the 1947 Studebaker, touted as "First by Far with a Postwar Car", had a completely new body. The new Land Cruiser exclusively rode the company's longest wheelbase (124 in (3,100 mm)), which provided additional legroom for rear seat passengers. It featured center-opening, rear-hinged rear suicide doors and was powered by the larger of Studebaker's two straight-6 engines. The Land Cruiser suggested price of $2043 included a one-piece curved windshield, an electric clock and carpeting front and rear. Only minor trim changes for 1948 brought a Land Cruiser price of $2265, and in 1949 it was increased to $2328 ($30,765 in 2024 dollars).

Since it was a seller's market after WWII, Studebaker felt no need to change the basic design of the car, even though they knew that other makers would have “new” cars in 1949. Studebaker coasted along with the old bodies until 1952.

But 1950 saw the “Next Look in Cars" — Studebaker's answer to the other manufacturer's 1949 models. Considered very radical for the era, it had three-point front styling, popularly known as the “bullet-nose”, similar in style to the 1949 Ford. Over 10,000 more Land Cruisers were sold in 1950 than in 1949. Studebaker Automatic Drive was introduced mid-year and was arguably the most advanced automatic transmission of the day. It featured reverse gear lock-out, hill-holder, anti-creep and a locking torque converter which allowed direct drive with virtually no converter power loss in high gear. The price of the 1950 Land Cruiser went down to $2187.

Sales in 1951 skyrocketed, an increase of almost 12,000 over 1950. This can probably be attributed to the introduction of the lively new Studebaker V8 engine that year. The front styling stayed virtually the same, with a minor redesign of the three points. Once again, the Land Cruiser had its own wheelbase, at 119"; the Commander now shared the 115" wheelbase of the Champion models. The price was raised to $2289.

The 1952 Land Cruiser was the last to use real glass for the tail and parking light lenses. Its grille, designated by some as the "clam digger", was actually a preview of the next generation.

== 1953–1954 models ==
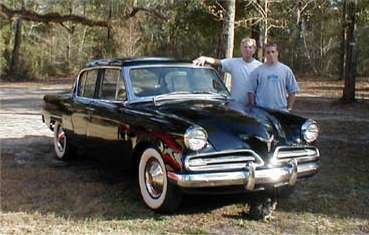
1953 Land Cruiser

The 1953 Land Cruisers were complete departure from the ’47-’52 models. The 1953 model sold retail for $2316 ($27,219 in 2024 dollars). They were built on the same frame as the new Starliner and Starlight coupe models but, as with many new models, there were some initial problems, primarily with the fit of the front fenders. With the engine out of the car, they fit. With the engine in the car, they didn’t. This was found to be primarily the fault of using a thinner gauge steel for the frame. The theory was that if the frame could flex a little, the car would ride better. The problem was, it flexed too much. If you jacked up one corner of the car, to change a tire, for example, the frame flexed so much that you could either not open the door or could not close it. There were also fewer frame re-enforcements than in subsequent years. As you might imagine, this problem caused many a late night conference and hasty fixes and tended to give the new model a bad name almost immediately.

Then a problem with the new (and revolutionary, for its day) mechanical power steering raised its head. It only required 2 psi (0.14 bar) of pressure to turn the steering wheel but it was noisy. Only 100 of these units were sold before Studebaker began using GM Saginaw type units.

The Studebaker company had a problem with the Mercedes-Benz company. A few years in the future, Studebaker would be the American distributor for that brand, but in 1953, the M-B tri-star emblem was turned upside down and put on the front and rear of Studebaker cars, minus the encircling ring. (Mercedes-Benz cars were still relatively unknown in America at that time, so most people probably would never have drawn any connection between the two brands.) In the upper part, the Commander had a gold “8” while the Champion a gold “S”. The upside-down tri-star was used elsewhere in the car. The wheel covers, back-up light lenses, radio delete plate, horn button and the rear ashtray on the Starliner/Starlight coupe—all had this emblem. M-B complained and Studebaker hastily re-designed the emblems. On the hood and trunk, they removed the M-B look-alike and on the Commander, replaced it with a large gold “8” in the middle of a chrome “V” (basically they removed one of the three arms of the "star", changing it into a "v".) On the Champion, a gold “S” replaced the “8”. When the other items ran their course, they were replaced by non-tri-star items. These are now collector's items.

The construction problems were corrected in the 1954 Land Cruiser models with heavier metal in the frames and an additional re-enforcing crossmember. The famous designer, Eleanor LeMaire was retained to brighten up the interiors of the new cars. She demanded 4 more colorful interiors than previously, getting away from the one drab gray pin stripe color of the previous year. These new colors included green, blue and tan as well as an opulent silver-gray. The front grille bars had 5 small vertical fins each to differentiate them from the earlier model. New, larger brakes were included in the package, shortening stopping distances by 37 ft (11 m) according to Motor Trend. Engine horsepower increased to 127 as the result of a 0.5 compression increase (to 7.5).

There was also a smoother looking instrument panel, doing away with the individually hooded gauges of the previous year. The 1954 Land Cruiser sold for $2438.

All in all, many people are of the opinion that the 1954 Land Cruiser was better designed than the 1955 Ultra-Vista wrap around windshield President models. While it was in keeping with most other brands of the era, the large amount of chrome (demanded by the sales department) caused many people to shy away from the ’55 Studebakers. In 1955, the name was changed.

== Follow-ups and legacy ==
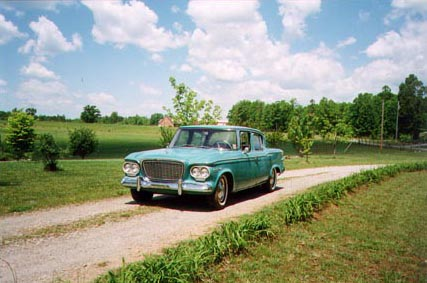
1961 Studebaker Lark Cruiser is considered a spiritual successor to Studebaker Land Cruisers of late 40s and early 50s.

Top-trimmed Studebakers from 1955–1958 went by the Studebaker President name (revived from the prewar President models). For 1956, an upscale President Classic sedan was offered. The President Classic used the longer 120.5" wheelbase of the Hawks, and like the 1947–1950 Land Cruisers used the additional length to create a roomier rear passenger area. The President Classic was continued for 1957–1958, though no longer carrying the "Classic" model name. After a four-year run, The President models, in turn, were dropped at the end of 1958 to make way for the new compact Lark model. A longer wheelbase version of the Lark sedan was offered for fleet sales. Dubbed the Economiler, it was marketed for use as a taxicab, again featuring a roomier back seat area than the regular Larks.

For the 1961, Studebaker added a Lark model, the Cruiser, which continued through the 1966 model year. This model was built on the longer wheelbase chassis and was a better equipped and more luxurious version of the 4-door Lark and was designed to harken back to the Studebaker Land Cruiser sedans of the late Forties and early Fifties.
