= Studebaker President =

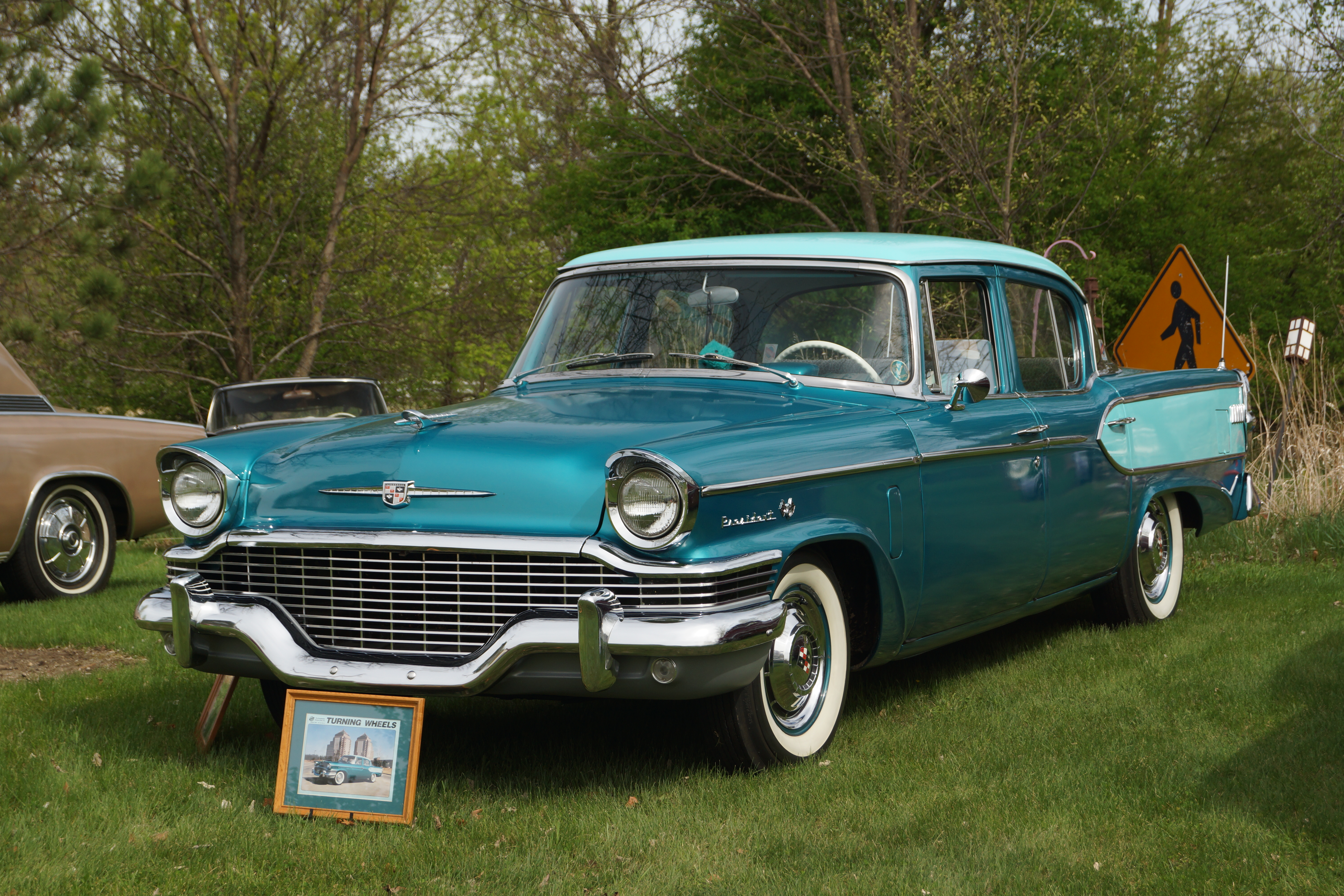
- 1957 Studebaker President

Overview
- Manufacturer: Studebaker
- Production: 1926–1942; 1955–1958
- Assembly: Studebaker Automotive Plant, South Bend, Indiana, United States

Body and chassis
- Class: Full-size (1926-1942) (1955-58)
- Layout: FR layout

Chronology
- Predecessor: Studebaker Big Six (1926)

The Studebaker President was the premier automobile model manufactured by the Studebaker Corporation of South Bend, Indiana in the United States from 1926 until 1942. The nameplate was reintroduced in 1955 and used until the end of the 1958 model when the name was retired.

== First generation ==
First generation
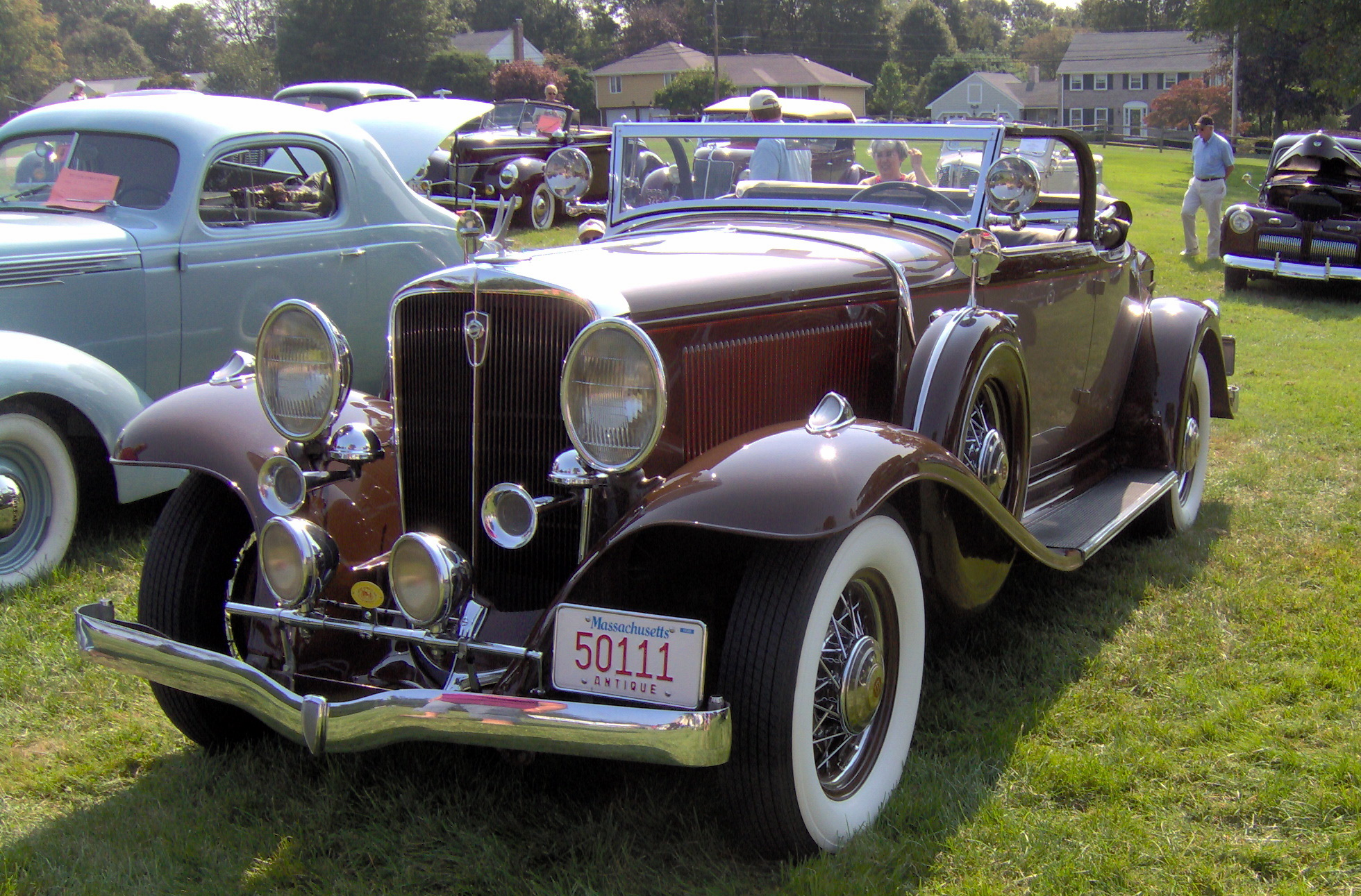
- 1931 Studebaker President four seasons roadster

Overview
- Production: 1926–1933

Body and chassis
- Body style: 2-door roadster 4-door sedan

Powertrain
- Engine: 354 cu in (5,800 cc) I6; 312.5 cu in (5,121 cc) I8

Prior to mid-1926, Studebaker's premium model was the Studebaker Big Six. The first automobile bearing the name President was unveiled on July 23, 1926, designated as the ES model in internal Studebaker memos. It was powered by a 354 cu in (5,800 cc) six-cylinder engine until the appearance in January 1928 of the smaller and smoother straight-eight engine of 312.5 cu in (5,121 cc). Albert Russel Erskine, Studebaker's president, spared no expense in his goal of making the President the finest automobile on the American road, with prices ranging from $1,985 to $2,485 ($37,219 to $46,594 in 2025 dollars). Presidents produced from 1928 to 1933 established land speed records, some of which went unbroken for 35 years. The President benefited from engineering improvements once the company took control of Pierce-Arrow in 1928.

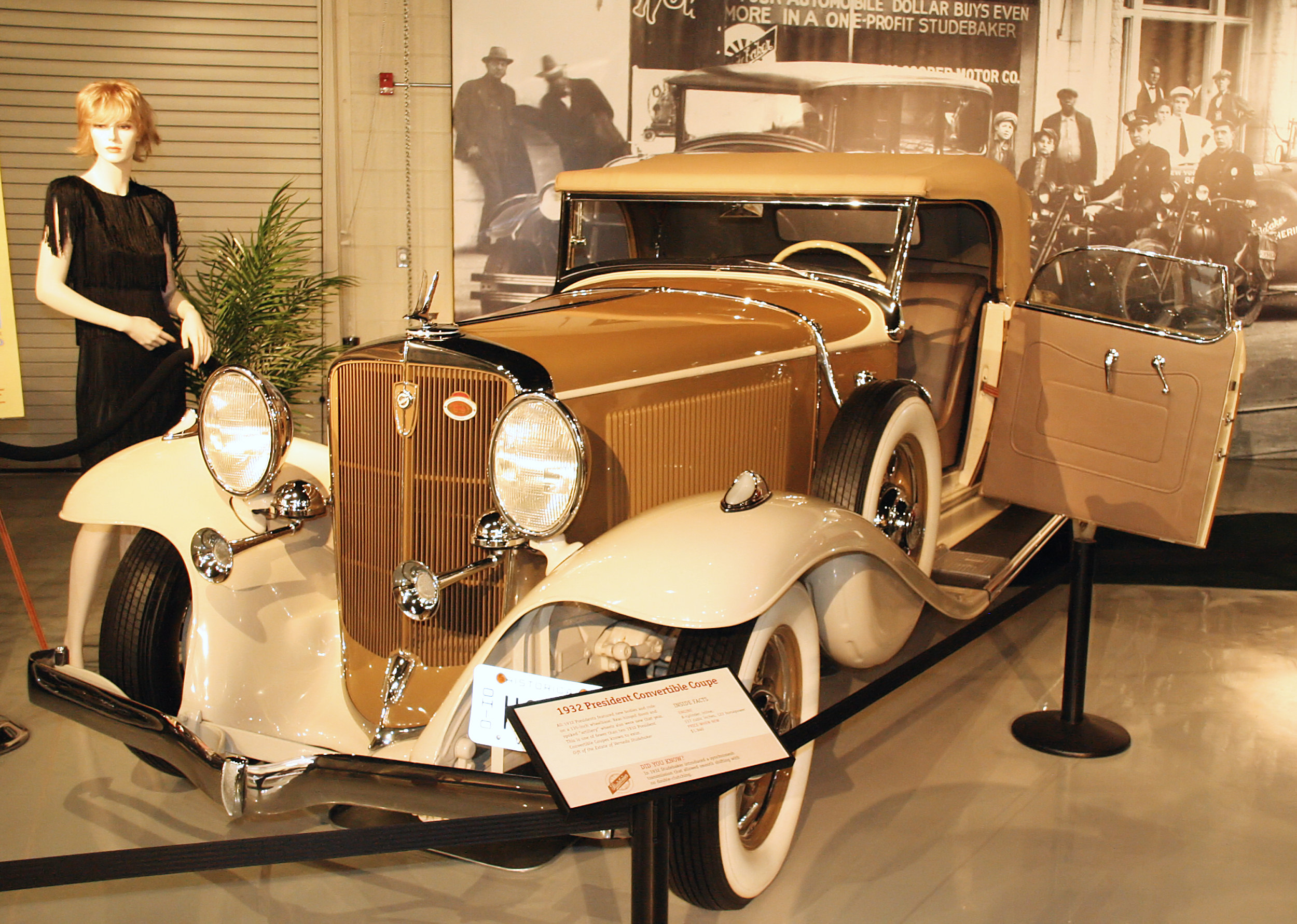
1932 President Convertible Coupe in the collection of the Studebaker National Museum.

The primary advances of the 1931 engine was the increase in displacement to 337 cu in (5,520 cc) and the crankshaft was drilled for oil passage to each of its nine large main bearings. At this time, the straight-eight engines of many other firms had only five bearings; connecting the crank throws of every pair of cylinders between said bearings, their crankshafts had a heavy diagonal beam to take the stress, and the lubrication of the bearings was not as effective. Other advances for performance were that the valves had spring dampers and the muffler was a straight-through type. With these improvements the engine achieved 122 hp (91 kW). It also had modern filters for air, oil, and fuel, an improved thermostat, and a Lanchester vibration damper.

In 1931, Studebaker introduced "Ovaloid" headlights which were oblong in shape and made identification of the President and other "senior" Studebaker models easier. Presidents manufactured in this era were considered to rival more expensive marques such as Cadillac, Packard, Lincoln, and Chrysler's Imperial model range. Studebaker went into receivership during 1933–34, Albert Erskine committed suicide, and the era of the big, impressive President came to an abrupt end.

== Second generation ==
Second generation
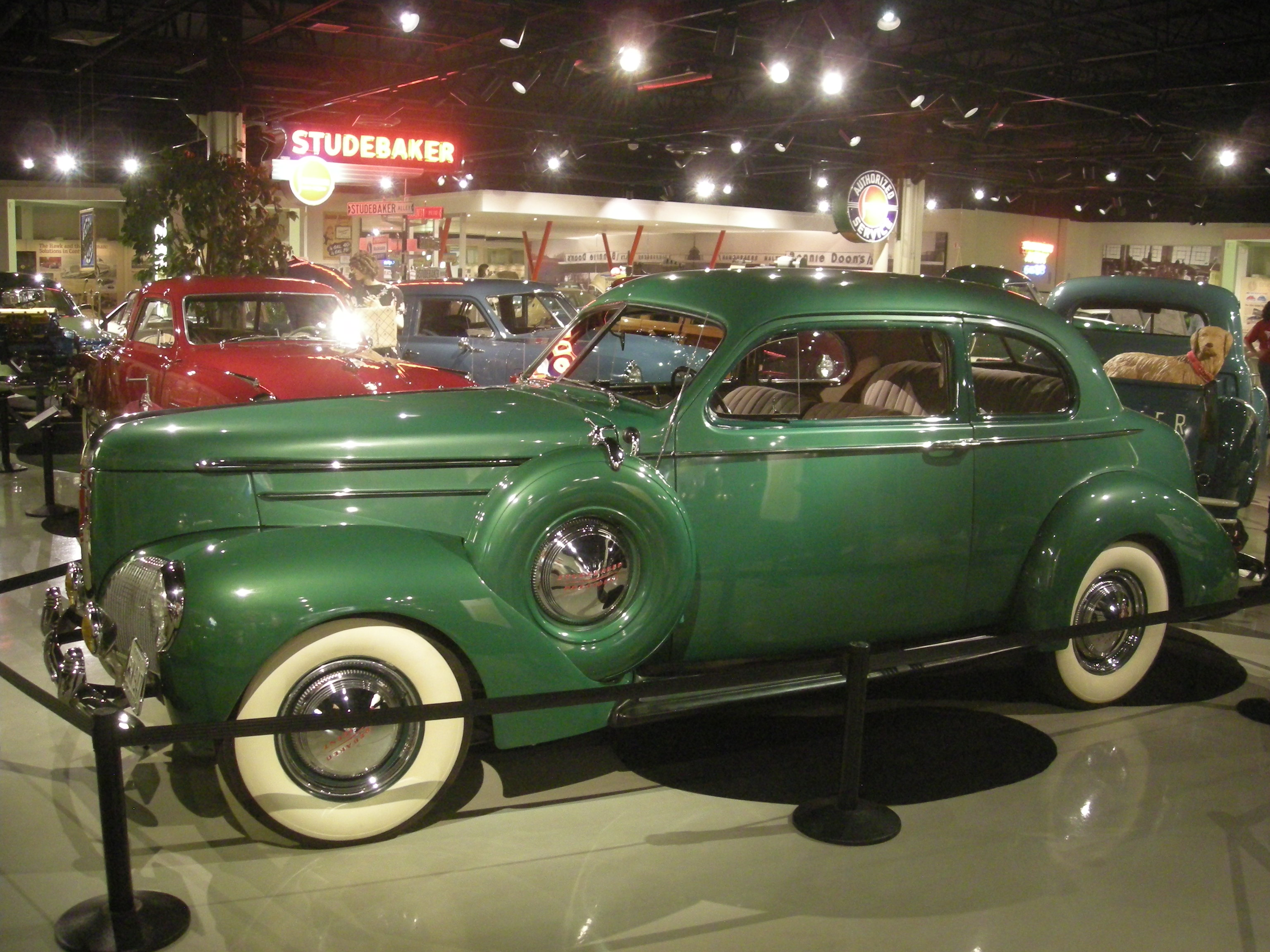
- 1940 Studebaker President Club Sedan

Overview
- Production: 1934–1940

Body and chassis
- Body style: 2-door coupe 2-door roadster 2-door sedan 4-door sedan

For 1934, Studebaker trimmed its model lineup and streamlined its vehicles. The company designed a new body, the Land Cruiser, which was offered on the Dictator, Commander and President. The Land Cruiser models were easily identified by their extreme streamlining features, unusual 4-piece rear window, trunk and the full fender skirts on the rear of the vehicle. The new Presidents were smaller and less impressive than their predecessors, though still fine automobiles, priced at $1,245, ($29,964 in 2025 dollars).

For 1935, Presidents and Commanders offered an optional wood sliding roof similar to sunroofs common on vehicles today. In 1936, all Studebaker cars featured the "Planar" suspension system, and offered the "Startix" automatic engine-starting system as an optional accessory. Vehicles manufactured from 1936 also showed the influence of industrial designer Raymond Loewy, who was hired as Studebaker's design consultant, and Helen Dryden who specialised in interior styling. Studebaker made its Hill-Holder device (an anti-rollback brake system) standard on the President in that year.

In 1938, the company offered a remote-controlled "Miracle-Shift" transmission which featured a dashboard-mounted shifter. The unit was discontinued in 1939 when the transmission shift lever was moved to the steering column.

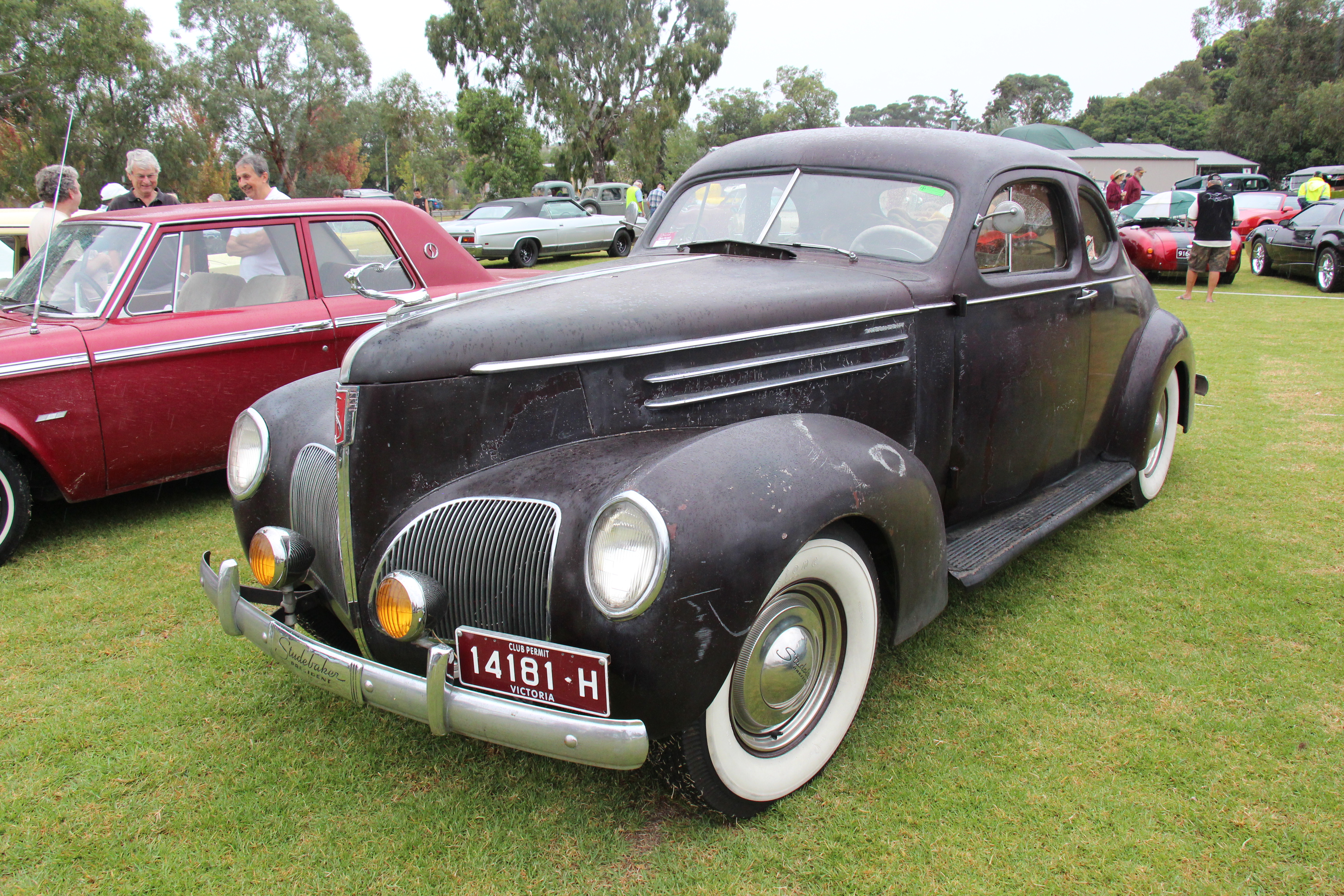
1939 Studebaker State President Coupe

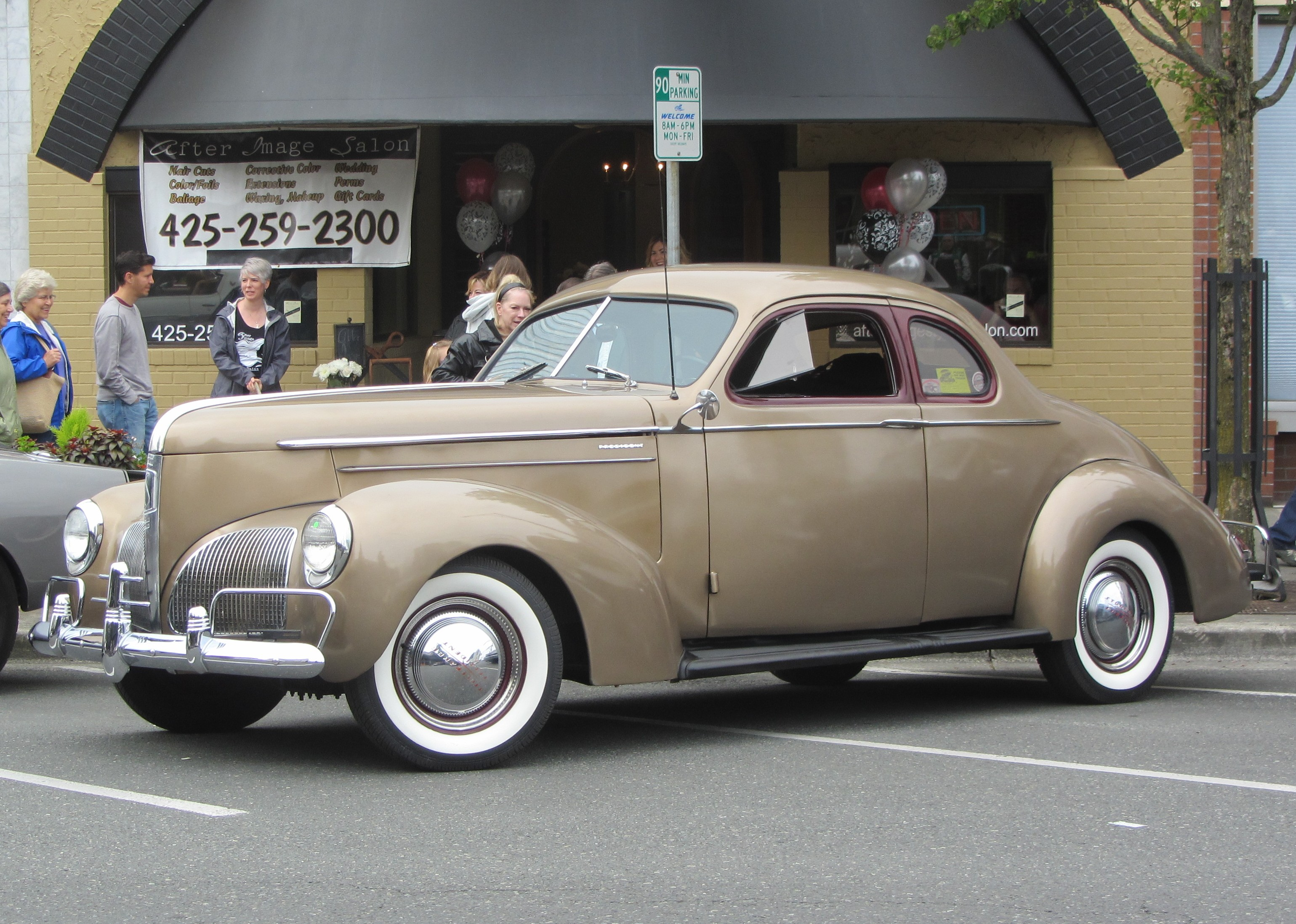
1940 Studebaker President Coupe

== Third generation ==
Third generation
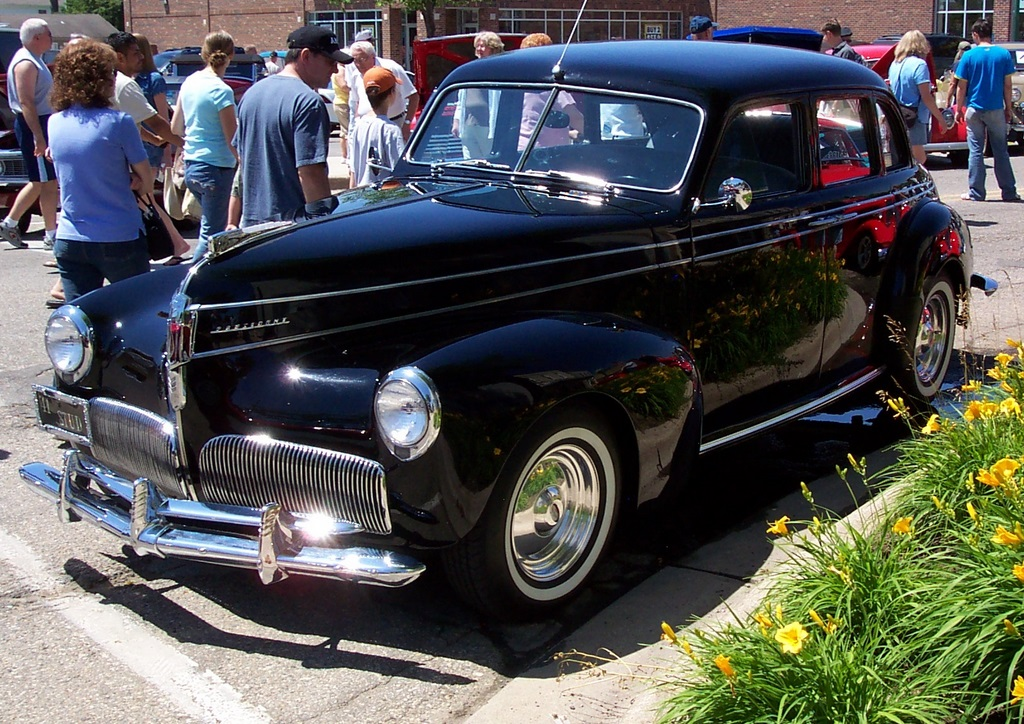
- 1941 Studebaker President

Overview
- Production: 1941–1942

Body and chassis
- Body style: 2-door roadster 4-door sedan

For 1941, the President received a new body style, a four-door sedan with rear-opening rear doors, as opposed to the then-conventional front-opening (suicide) rear doors. This vehicle was designated the Land Cruiser, recognizable by its concealed running-boards and lack of rear quarter-windows. The Land Cruiser was available in the beginning of 1941, in the Custom and DeLuxetone series. In mid year 1941, the Skyway series was introduced, with a Land Cruiser included. The Skyway had an upgrade in upholstery, and lacked the double strip of chrome down the side of the car. This style continued for the shortened 1942 model, after which the President was discontinued. The Skyway designation was, however, used for shortened 1946 Studebaker Champions.

== Fourth generation ==
Fourth generation
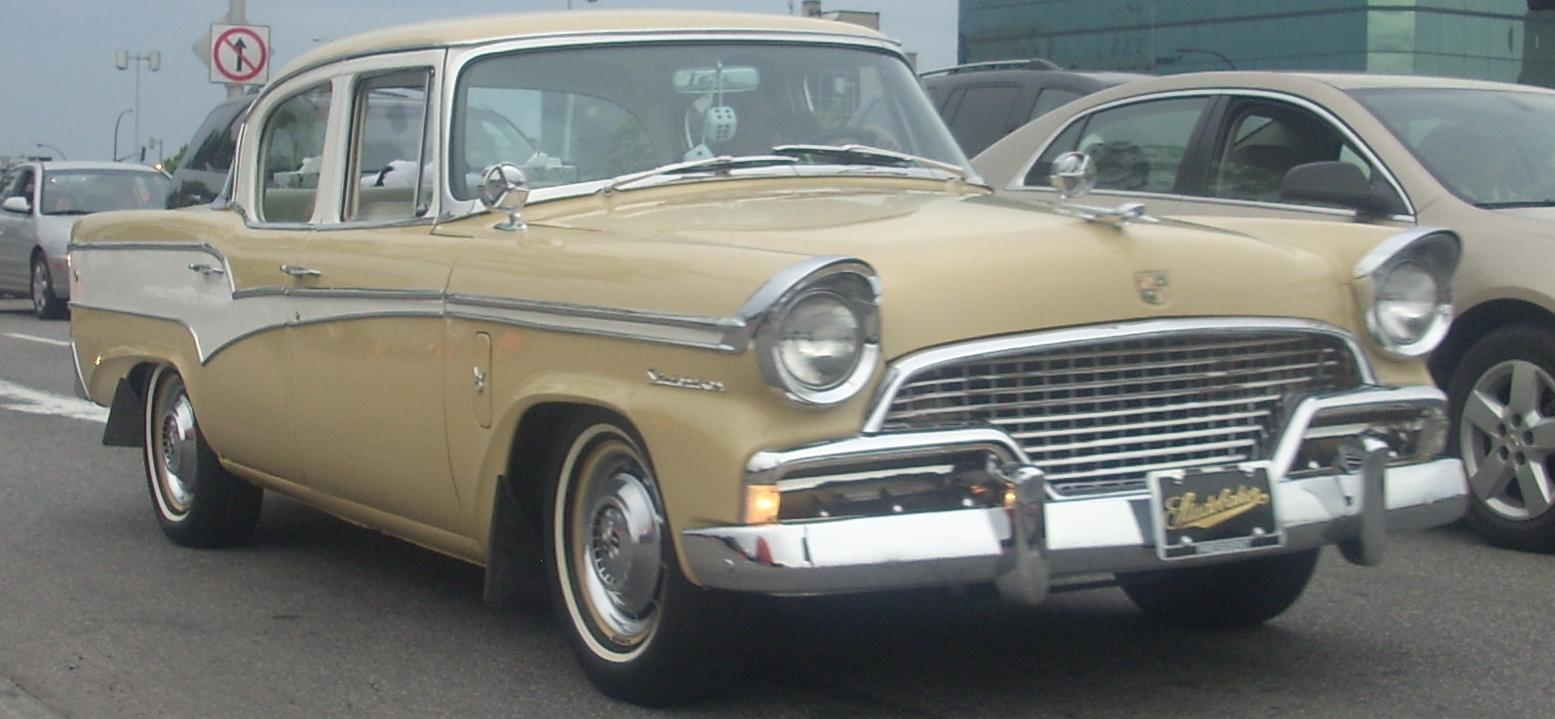
- 1956 Studebaker President 4-Door Sedan

Overview
- Production: 1955–1958

Body and chassis
- Body style: 2-door sedan 4-door sedan 2-door coupe 2-door hardtop 2-door station wagon 4-door station wagon
- Related: Studebaker Scotsman; Studebaker Commander; Studebaker Champion; Packard Clipper

Dimensions
- Wheelbase: 120.5 inches

Studebaker reintroduced the President nameplate in 1955 when it was applied to all premium-trimmed vehicles. The most noteworthy of these later Presidents was the 1955 Studebaker Speedster. The President name was discontinued after the 1958 model year, when Studebaker began focusing on the compact Studebaker Lark. The final editions of Packard automobiles (1957–58) were based on the fourth generation President platform.

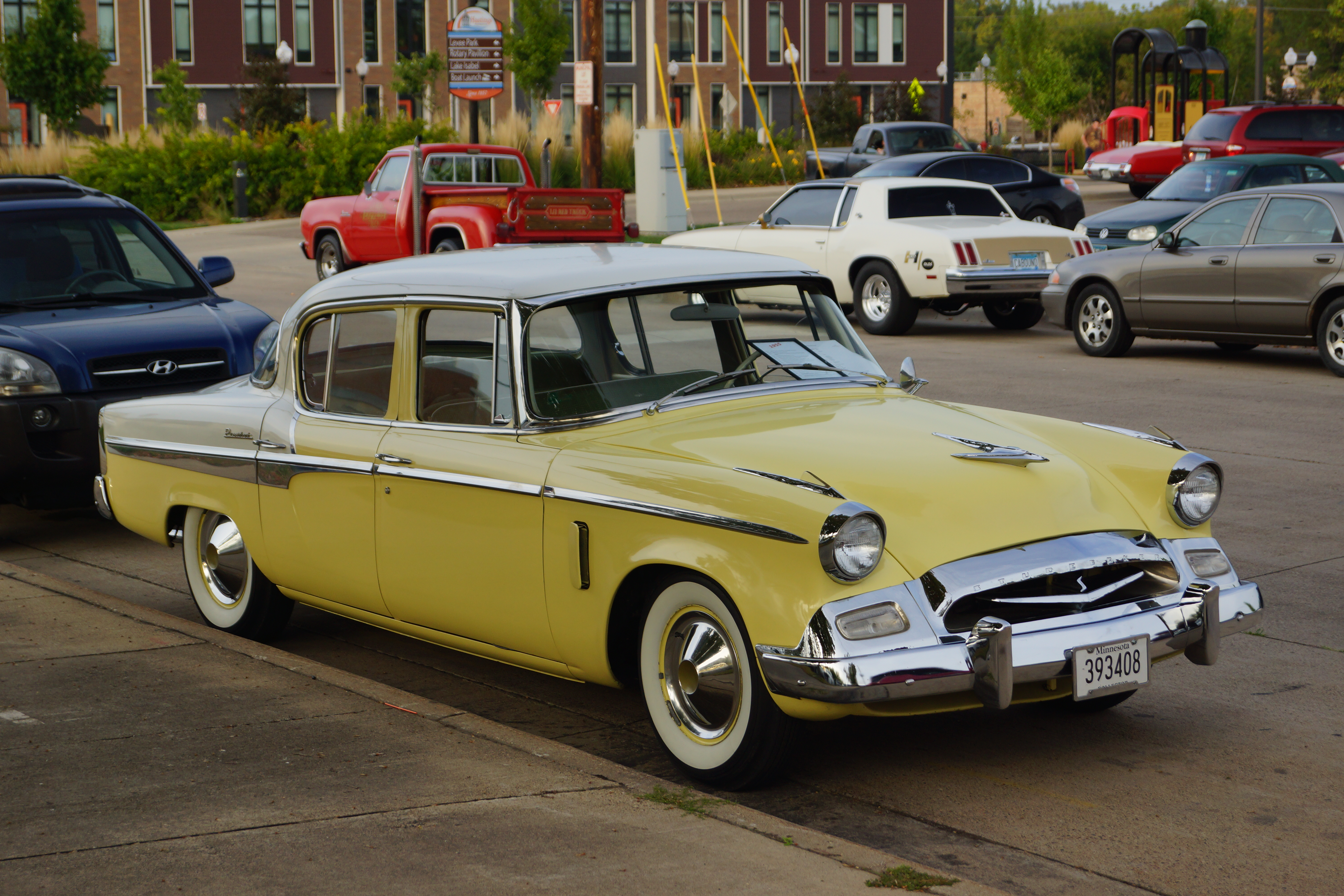
1955 Studebaker President State Ultra Vista 4-door Sedan

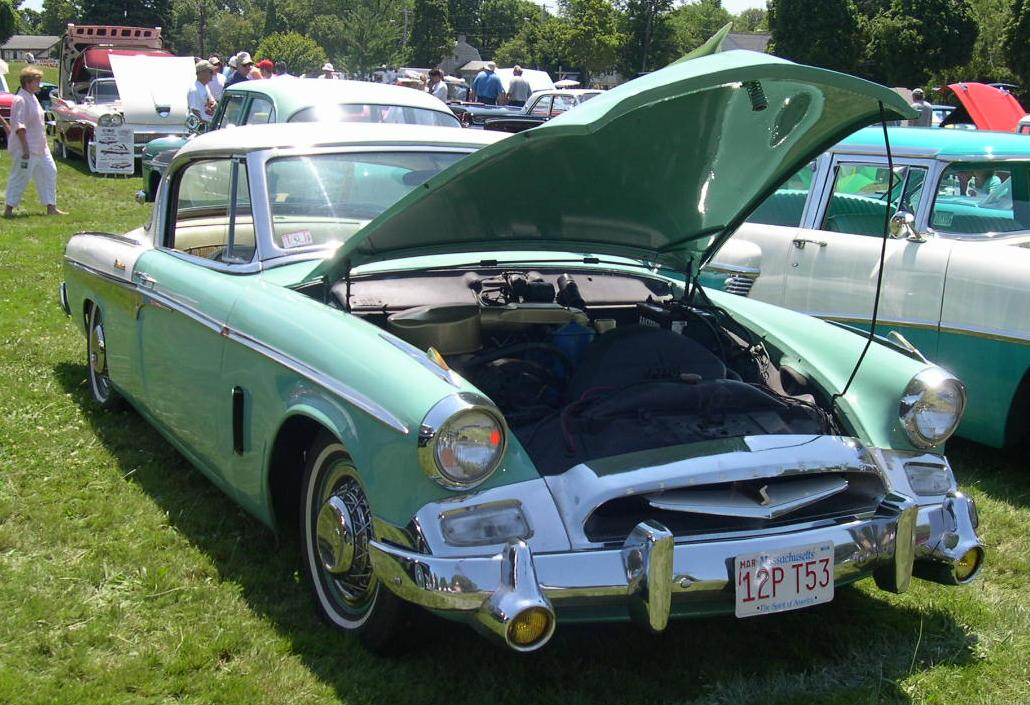
1955 Studebaker President State Hard-top

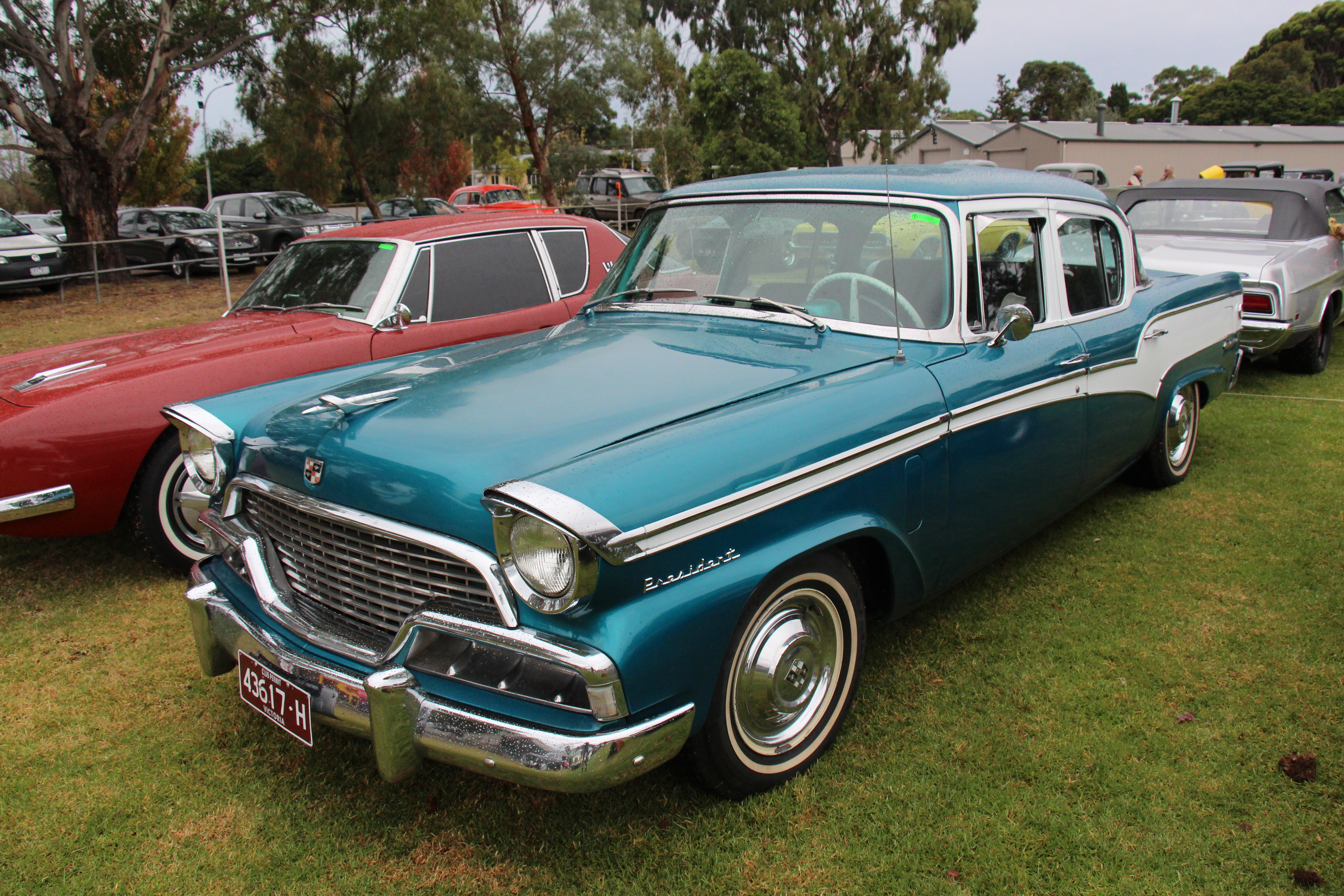
1956 Studebaker President 4-Door Sedan

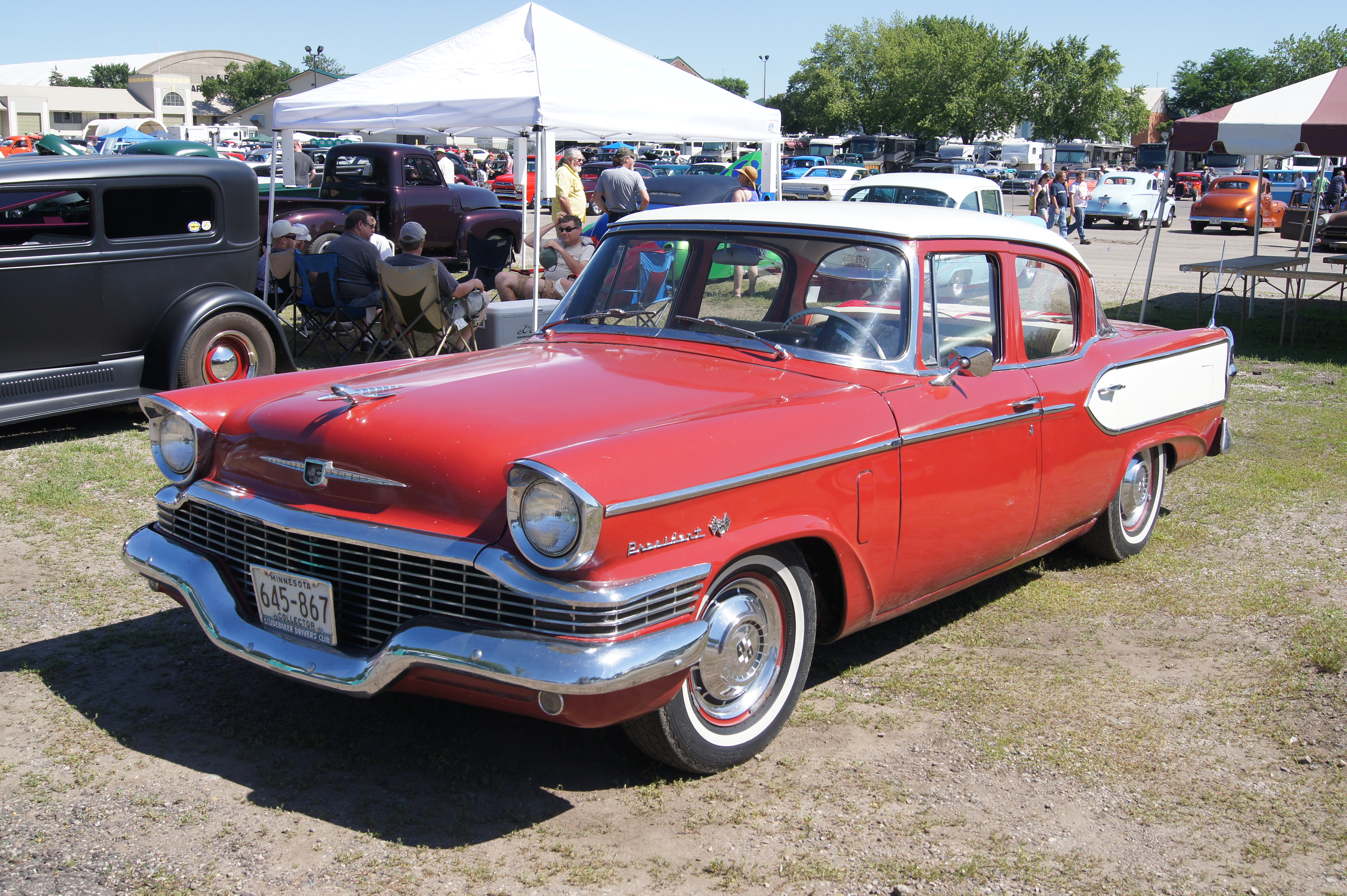
1957 Studebaker President 4-door Sedan

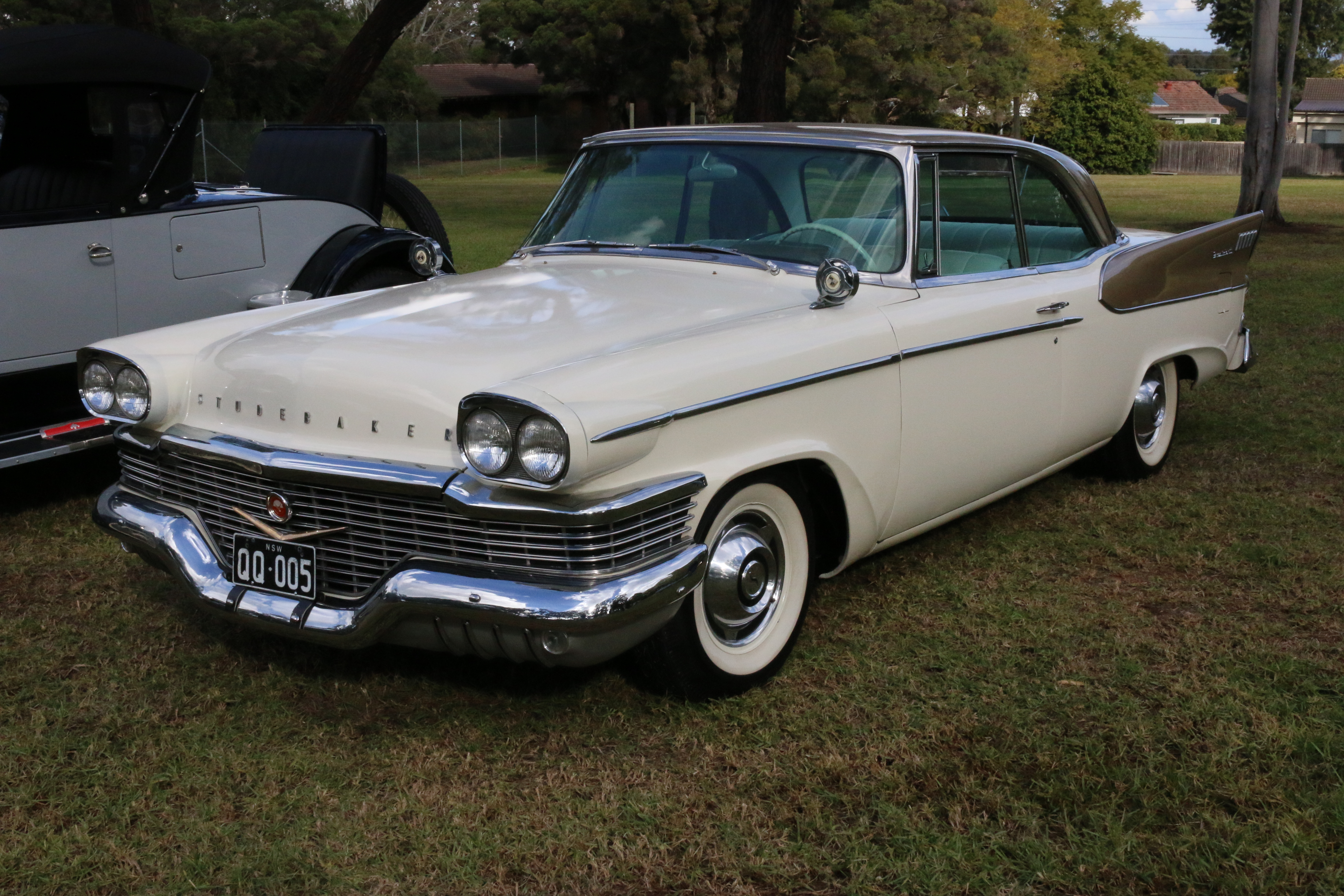
1958 Studebaker President Starlight

== Motorsports ==
The President set 118 stock car records in 1928. It also came in third in the 1932 Indianapolis 500.

== Classic car status ==
The Classic Car Club of America, regarded as the American authority for accreditation of "classic car" status, recognizes only the 38,403 8-cylinder FA & FB model Studebaker Presidents produced in 1928 and those produced between 1929 and 1933 as “full classics”.
