= Penelope Rowlands =

Biographer, essayist, journalist

- Born: London, England
- Occupations: Biographer; Essayist; Journalist
- Writing career
- Language: English
- Period: 1985–present
- Genres: Biography, Anthology
- Website: www.peneloperowlands.com/|Personal website

Penelope Rowlands is an Anglo-American author, essayist, and journalist best known for her 2005 biography, A Dash of Daring: Carmel Snow and Her Life in Fashion, Art, and Letters, about the Irish-born editor-in-chief of Harper's Bazaar (from 1934 to 1958).

== Biographies ==
=== A Dash of Daring ===
A Dash of Daring was published by Atria Books, a division of Simon & Schuster, in the US in 2005. The book was published in Britain by Simon and Schuster UK in 2006. A US paperback edition came out in 2008.

Suzy Menkes wrote in the International Herald Tribune that "Penelope Rowlands tells a dense, fast-paced story and deftly puts it in the context of magazine history.... Carmel Snow comes vividly to life. The biography was excerpted in U.S.Vogue in September 2005. The British version of Harper's Bazaar also published an excerpt.

Rowlands also wrote short biographies of the European industrial designers Jean Prouvé and Eileen Gray, both published by Chronicle Books in 2002.

== Anthologies ==
=== Paris Was Ours ===
Paris Was Ours is a collection of essays by thirty-two international writers on Paris and how it changed their lives. The anthology featured writing by Edmund White, Diane Johnson, the Cuban novelist Zoé Valdés, Judith Thurman, the Iraqi-born Assyrian editor Samuel Shimon and a homeless French blogger, among others. Rowlands edited the collection and wrote its final essay.

Paris Was Ours was chosen as the January 2011, Book of the Month by National Geographic Traveler magazine.

=== The Beatles Are Here! ===
In 2014 Rowlands edited and contributed an essay to the anthology The Beatles Are Here! 50 Years After the Band Arrived in America, Writers, Musicians, and Other Fans Remember, with contributions by Gay Talese, Cyndi Lauper, Billy Joel, and Greil Marcus. The cover design of the anthology features a photograph of a young Rowlands, screaming and holding a sign, previously published in the New York Times.

== Journalism ==
Rowlands has written articles on cultural subjects for publications such as Vogue, The New York Times, WSJ. magazine, the Columbia Journalism Review, among others. She has contributed historical essays and reporting to The American Scholar. In addition, Rowlands has been a contributing writer to Architectural Digest and a contributing editor to ARTnews and Metropolis magazines. She has written book reviews for the Wall Street Journal, the San Francisco Chronicle, and other publications.

== Fellowships and awards ==
Leon Levy Fellowship, Summer / Fall 2019. The Center for the History of Collecting, Frick Art Reference Library, The Frick Collection, New York City.

== Background ==
Born in London to an American mother and a British father, Rowlands migrated to the United States with her family at the age of five and was raised in her mother's native New York City. She is a citizen of both the U.S. and the United Kingdom. She received a B.A. from Bard College and an M.A. from Stanford University. She has lived in California and Paris but now resides in Princeton, New Jersey.

== Published works ==
- 2014 The Beatles Are Here! 50 Years After The Band's Arrival in America, Writers, Musicians, and Other Fans Remember, Algonquin Books of Chapel Hill
- 2011 Paris Was Ours: 32 Writers Reflect on the City of Light, Algonquin Books
- 2005 A Dash of Daring: Carmel Snow and Her Life in Fashion, Art, and Letters, Atria Books (Simon & Schuster)
- 2002 Jean Prouvé: Visionary Humanist, Chronicle Books
- 2002 Eileen Gray: Modern Alchemist, Chronicle Books
- 2000 Weekend Houses (with photographer Mark Darley), Chronicle Books
