= Jean Buffong =

Grenadian-British novelist and poet (born 1943)

Jean Buffong (born 1943) is a Grenadian-British novelist and poet.

== Life ==
Born in Grenada, Buffong settled in the United Kingdom and worked as a lawyer. She started writing fiction in her early forties. Her work consists of poetry, short stories, novels and plays, and is centred on her Grenadian childhood. Under the Silk Cotton Tree (1992) is set in Grenada, though family connections between Grenada and Trinidad bring out the interconnectedness of the Caribbean and the importance of migration in everyday life.

Buffong has been welfare officer for the West Indian Standing Conference, an active member of the Caribbean Women Writers' Alliance and the Chairperson of the Ananse Society. She divides her time between London and The Gambia.

== Works ==
- (with Nellie Payne) Jump-up-and-kiss-me: Two stories of Grenada. London: Women's Press, 1990.
- (ed. with Mandla Langa, Diana Mead and Chris Searle) Just a Breath Away: A national anthology of poetry by children and young people in Britain. [Sheffield]: Local Authorities Against Apartheid, 1991.
- Under the Silk Cotton Tree: a novel. London: Women's Press, 1992.
- Snowflakes in the Sun. London: Women's Press, 1995.
- (ed. with Maureen Roberts and Tony La Mothe) Voices in a New Dawn: Grenadian writers' stories, essays and poetry. London: Redemption Press, 2004. ISBN 9780953580040
