= Margaret Mayo (children's author) =

British writer, mostly of children's books, born 1935

Margaret Mary Cumming Mayo
- Born: Margaret Mary Cumming; 10 May 1935; London, England
- Died: August 25, 2022 (aged 87); Brighton, United Kingdom
- Occupation: Novelist
- Spouse: Peter Robin Mayo
- Children: 3
- Writing career
- Pen name: Margaret Mayo
- Period: 1974 – 2022
- Genre: Children's literature

Margaret Mayo, née Margaret Mary Cumming (born 10 May 1935 in London, England), is a British writer of children's literature and folktales since 1974.

== Biography ==
Born Margaret Mary Cumming on 10 May 1935 in London, England, the daughter of William John and Anna (Macleod) Cumming. In 1958 she married Peter Robin Mayo; they had three children. She was a former teacher, who lived in Brighton, and died aged 87.

== Bibliography ==
=== Anthologies ===
- If You Should Meet a Crocodile (1974)
- Book of Magical Horses (1976)
- Book of Magical Birds (1977)
- Book of Magical Cats (1978)
- Saints, Birds and Beasts (1980)
- The Italian Fairy Book (1981)
- Fairy Tales from France (1983)
- The Orchard Book of Magical Tales (1993)
- Magical Tales from Many Lands (1993)
- Magical Tales (1993)
- First Fairy Tales (1994)
- The Orchard Book of Creation Stories (1995)
- The Orchard Book of Mythical Birds and Beasts (1996)
- Mythical Birds and Beasts from Many Lands (1997)
- First Bible Stories (1998)
- Sleepytime Stories (1998)
- The Orchard Book of the Unicorn and Other Magical Animals (2001)
- A Pea, a Princess and a Pig: Fairy Stories (2001)
- Wiggle Waggle Fun: Stories And Rhymes for the Very, Very Young (2002)
- Cinderella (2002)
- Hansel and Gretal (2002)
- Jack and the Beanstalk (2002)
- Snow White (2002)
- The Orchard Book of Favourite Stories and Poems (2003)
- The Orchard Book of Favourite Rhymes and Verse (2003)
- Stories Rhymes and Fun for the Very Young (2017)
- Bedtime Stories (2018)

=== Novels ===
- Brother Sun, Sister Moon (1999)

=== Picture books ===
- Little Mouse Twitchy-whiskers (1992)
- How to Count Crocodiles (1994)
- Plum Pudding (2000)
- Dig Dig Digging (2001)
- Emergency! (2002)
- Toot Toot Clickety Clack (2004)
- The Frog Prince (2005)
- Puss in Boots (2006)
- Choo Choo Clickerty-clack! (2006)
- Roar! (2006)
- Snap! (2010)
- Stomp, Dinosaur, Stomp! (2010)
- Zoom Rocket Zoom (2011)
- Big Digger abc (2015)

=== Creation Myths ===
- How Earth Was Made (1998)
- How Men and Women Were Made (1998)
- How the Sun Was Made and Other Stories (1998)
- Why the Sea Is Salt and Other Stories (1998)

=== Magical Tales from Around the World ===
- The Fiery Phoenix (2003)
- The Giant Sea Serpent (2003)
- The Incredible Thunderbird (2003)
- The Magical Mermaid (2003)
- The Man Eating Minotaur (2003)
- Pegasus and the Proud Prince (2003)
- Unanana and the Enormous Elephant (2003)
- Pegasus and the Prince (2004)
