= Anne Rittenhouse =

American journalist

Harry-dele Hallmark (August 30, 1867, in Pensacola, Florida — August 1, 1932 in Philadelphia, Pennsylvania), who wrote under the name "Anne Rittenhouse", was the fashion editor of The New York Times for several decades. CNN has called her "legendary".

== Early life ==
Hallmark was born in Pensacola, Florida, to Harrison P. Hallmark and Adele MacAllister Hallmark; her name is a combination of theirs. After her parents' deaths when she was still "very young", she moved to Augusta, Georgia.

== Career ==
After entering journalism as the society editor for the Augusta Chronicle, Hallmark moved to Philadelphia, where she edited The Philadelphia Press and the Philadelphia Public Ledger. She joined the McClure Newspaper Syndicate as an assistant editor, and eventually wrote the daily fashion column "What the Well-Dressed Woman is Wearing" (also referred to as "What Well-Dressed Women are Wearing", and simply "Well-Dressed Women" and "The Well-Dressed Woman"), which appeared in over 100 newspapers, including the Shanghai Evening Post.

Her work was also published in Ladies' Home Journal and the Saturday Evening Post.
