= Turning Wheels =

Turning Wheels is a monthly publication of the Studebaker Drivers Club, Inc. dedicated to the preservation, maintenance and enjoyment of Studebaker vehicles. Created in 1972, its headquarters is in Maple Grove, Minnesota, United States. Monthly features include:

- The President's Message, a look at what's going on within the Club and the hobby in general;
- The Studebaker Co-Operator, a resource wherein members' tech questions are answered by the club's technical advisors;
- The Studebaker Almanac, a column dedicated to the history of the Studebaker Corporation and its people and products;
- What's Happening, a listing of club events from local meetings to regional and national meets;
- Letters to the Editor and classified ads.

Other recurring features include columns on modified Studebakers, reader submissions and detailed overviews of specific years and models.

A subscription to Turning Wheels is included with a membership in the 13,000 member Studebaker Drivers Club, which was founded in 1962 and is the largest of three US organizations serving Studebaker owners. Libraries and schools are eligible to receive Turning Wheels subscriptions at a reduced rate.
