= Studebaker Big Six =

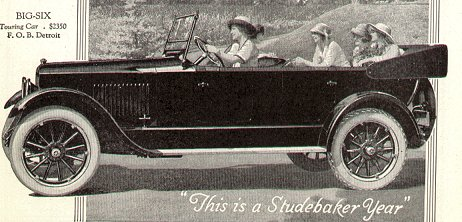
- A 1920 advertisement for the Studebaker Big Six touring car

Overview
- Manufacturer: Studebaker
- Model years: 1918–1927
- Assembly: Studebaker Automotive Plant, South Bend, Indiana, United States; Studebaker Automotive Plant, Detroit, Michigan, United States

Body and chassis
- Class: full-sized
- Layout: Front-engine, rear-wheel drive

Chronology
- Successor: Studebaker President

The Studebaker Big Six was an automobile produced by the Studebaker Corporation of South Bend, Indiana, between 1918 and 1926, being designated the Model EG (1918–21), the EK (1922–24), and the EP (1925–26); its name was due to the 127-inch wheelbase in comparison to the Studebaker Special Six at 120 in. In 1927, it was renamed the President (ES), pending introduction of a smaller and smoother straight-eight engine for new top-of-the-range models after January 1928.

== Early models ==
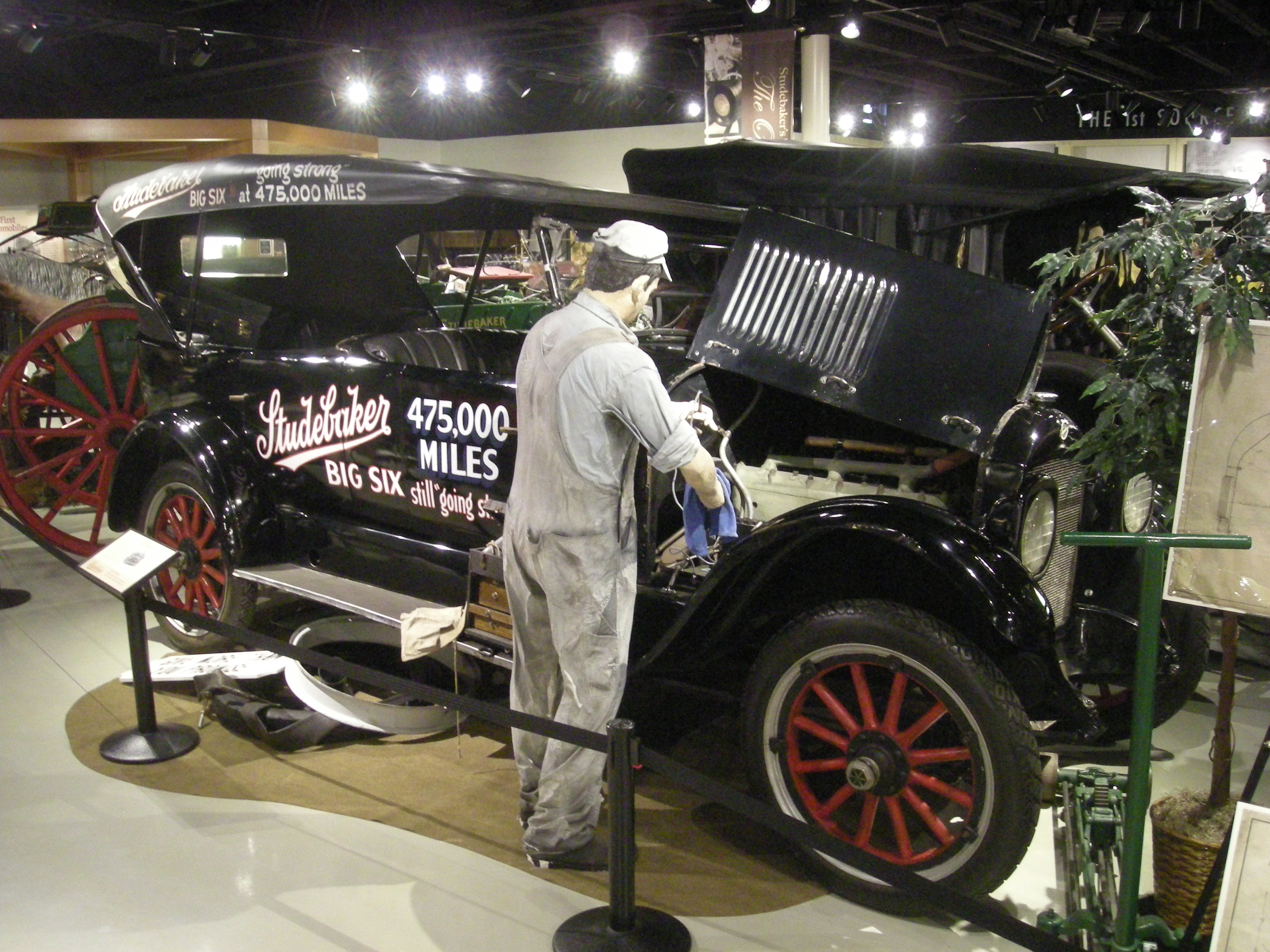
A 1919 Big Six at 475,000 miles

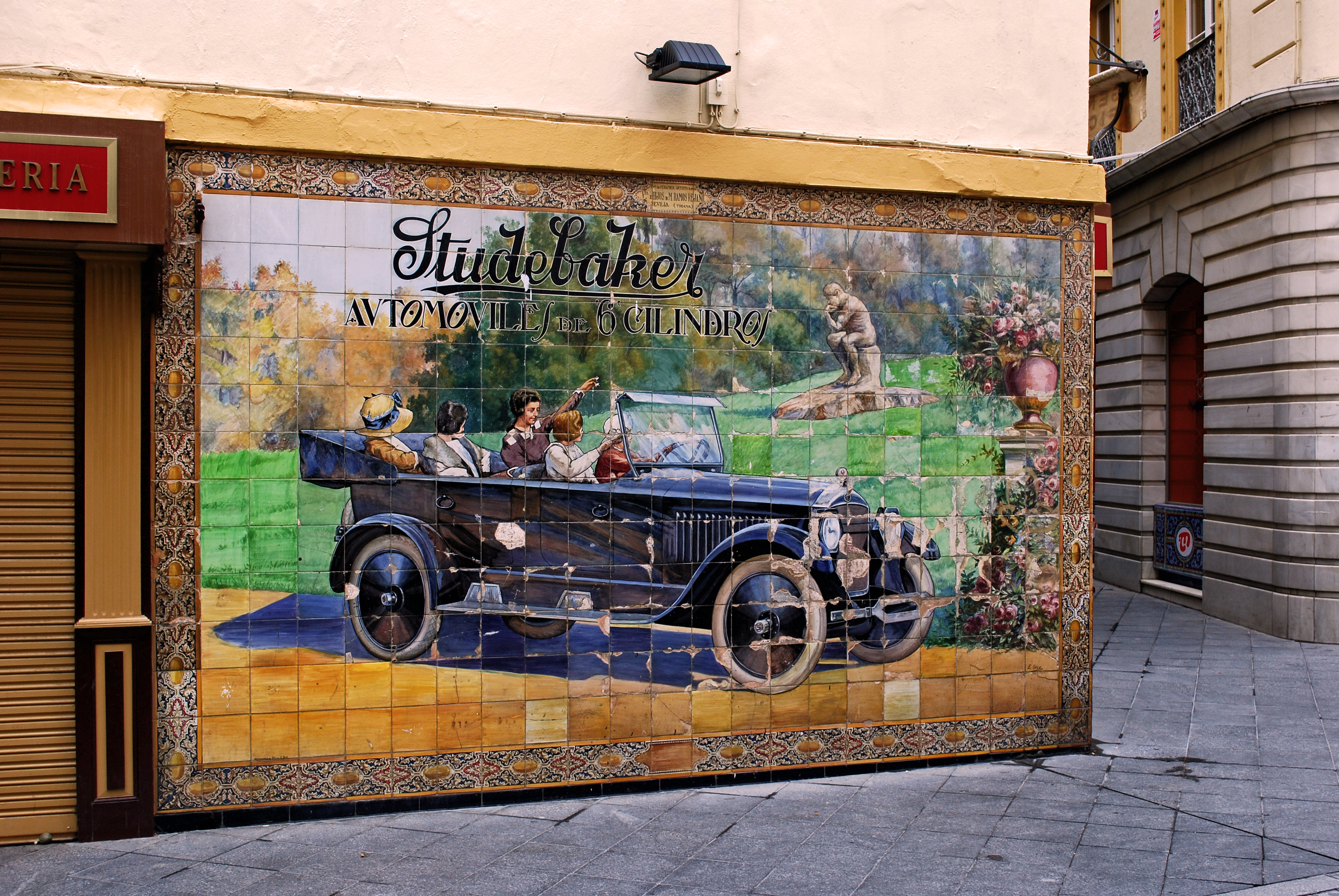
A 1924 illuminated, tiled display for Big Six touring car in Seville

All Studebaker models for 1918 represented an important milestone for the automaker, because they represented a clean break from the legacy of E-M-F Studebaker had been producing.

Between 1918 and 1920, the Big Six was offered only as a four-door touring car, the most popular body style for automobiles at the time. As the price of enclosed cars came down and consumers discovered the benefits of closed and semiclosed passenger compartments, a wider variety of body styles was made available beginning with the 1921 model year. By 1926, the Big Six was available in a variety of body styles, including a dual-cowl phaeton and a berline (sedan).

The 1918 and 1919 Big Sixes were powered by Studebaker's 354 cu in (5.8-liter) straight-six engine, which produced 60 bhp (45 kW) at 2000 rpm. By 1926, the engine was delivering 75 bhp (56 kW) at 2400 rpm. The car's wheelbase varied between 1918 120 in (3,048 mm) and 1926, when the car was available in either short 120 in (3,048 mm) or long 127 in (3,226 mm) wheelbases.

Studebaker's EK Big Six was popular with rum runners for its large size and ability to reach up to 80 mph (130 km/h); its C$3000 price was not a deterrent.

== 1920s production ==
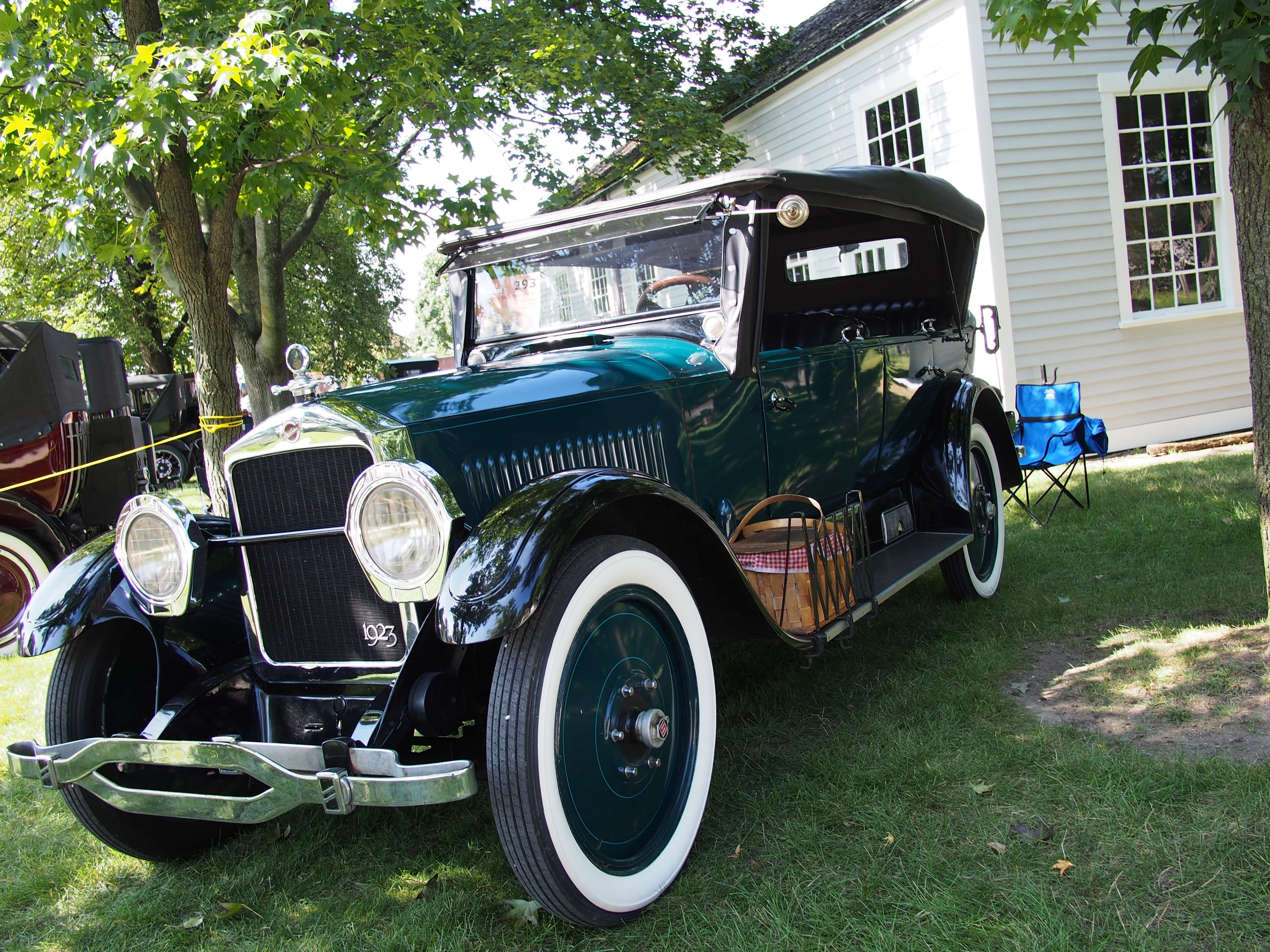
A 1923 Big Six

In the 1920s, 12 of the 14 Arizona counties issued Studebakers to their sheriffs, because of their reputation for power, reliability, and ability to withstand hard use and bad roads. In 1925, the company published a pamphlet about the Arizona sheriffs' Studebakers, and named their Big Six Sport Phaeton model the "Sheriff". One of the Arizona sheriffs' Big Six cars has been restored, and is on display at the Arizona Historical Society museum in Tucson.

At the 1924 New York Auto Show, Studebaker featured a 1918 Big Six that had a verified odometer reading over 500,000 miles (800,000 km), as a testament to the longevity and durability of Studebaker vehicles.

== Big Six President ==
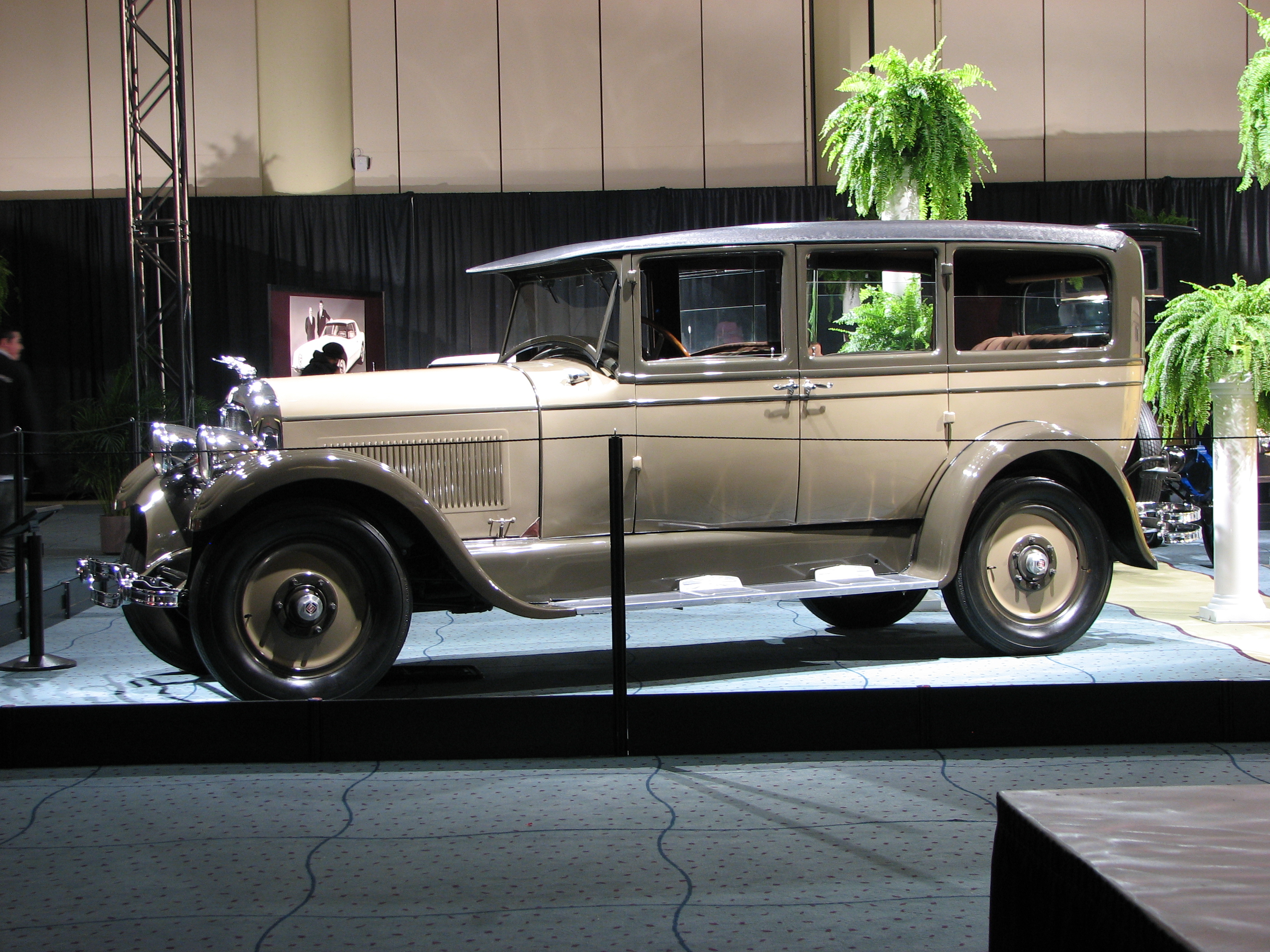
1927 Big Six President limousine

In 1927, the model gained the transitional model name Big Six President, as Studebaker began the process of converting all of its model names away from engine type-based names, and toward the more evocative Dictator (Standard Six) and Commander (Special Six). In the case of the Big Six President, 1928 marked the introduction of Studebaker's famed 313 cu in Straight-8, which developed 100 bhp (75 kW) at 2600 rpm. The larger, straight-six engine was used in the GB Commander before being replaced with a 248 cu in engine in 1929, marking the end of the line for the famous Big Six.

These sixes were the last descendants of rugged cars designed for poor roads in the early 20th century—loaded with torque and massively strong in construction. They were not suited to the higher cruising speeds made possible by better roads in later years.

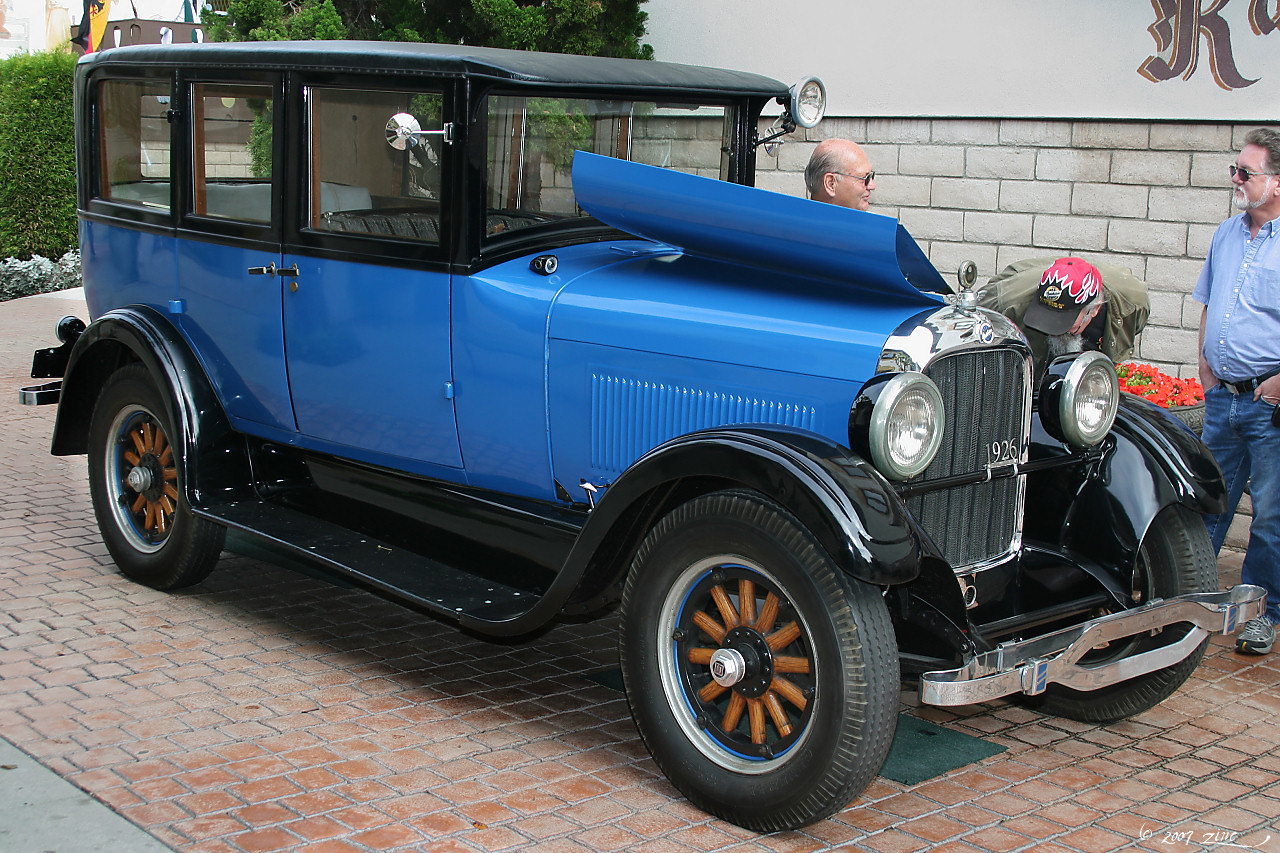
1926 Big Six

== Standard Big Six Sedan specifications (1926 data) ==
- Color - Studebaker blue with black upper structure
- Seating capacity – Seven
- Wheelbase - 127 inches (3,226 mm)
- Wheels - Wood
- Tires - 34 in × 7.30 in (864 mm × 185 mm) balloon
- Service brakes - contracting on rear
- Emergency brakes - contracting drum on rear of transmission
- Engine - Six cylinder, vertical, cast en bloc, 3.875 by 5 inches (98.4 mm × 127.0 mm); head removable; valves in side; 36 hp (27 kW; 36 PS) NACC rating

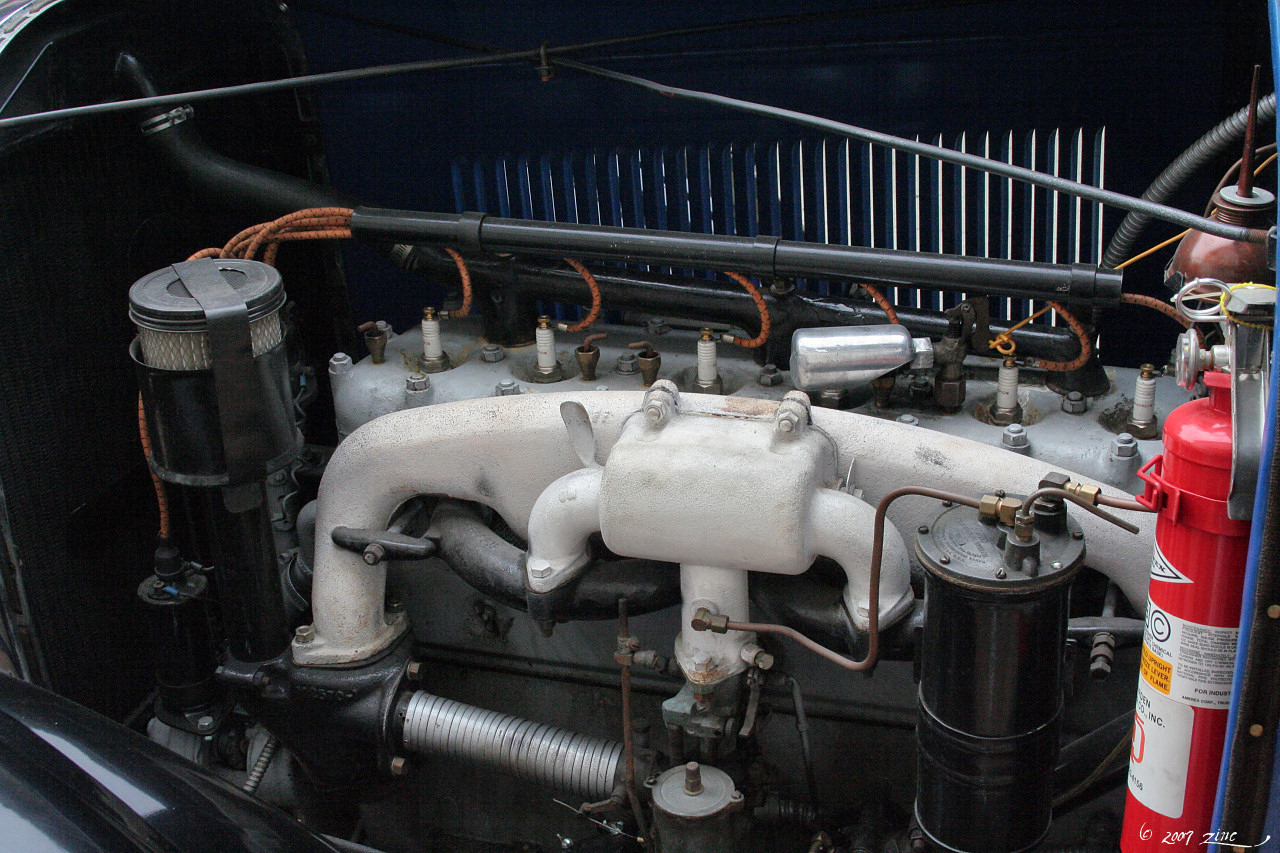
1926 Big Six

- Lubrication - Force feed
- Crankshaft - Four bearing
- Radiator – Tubular
- Cooling – Water pump
- Ignition –Battery
- Starting system – Two unit
- Voltage – Six to eight
- Wiring – Single
- Fuel feed – Vacuum
- Clutch – Dry plate, single disc
- Transmission –3-speed manual (3 forward, 1 reverse)) sliding
- Final drive – Spiral bevel gear
- Rear springs – Semi-elliptic
- Rear axle – Semi-floating
- Steering gear – Worm and roller

=== Standard equipment ===
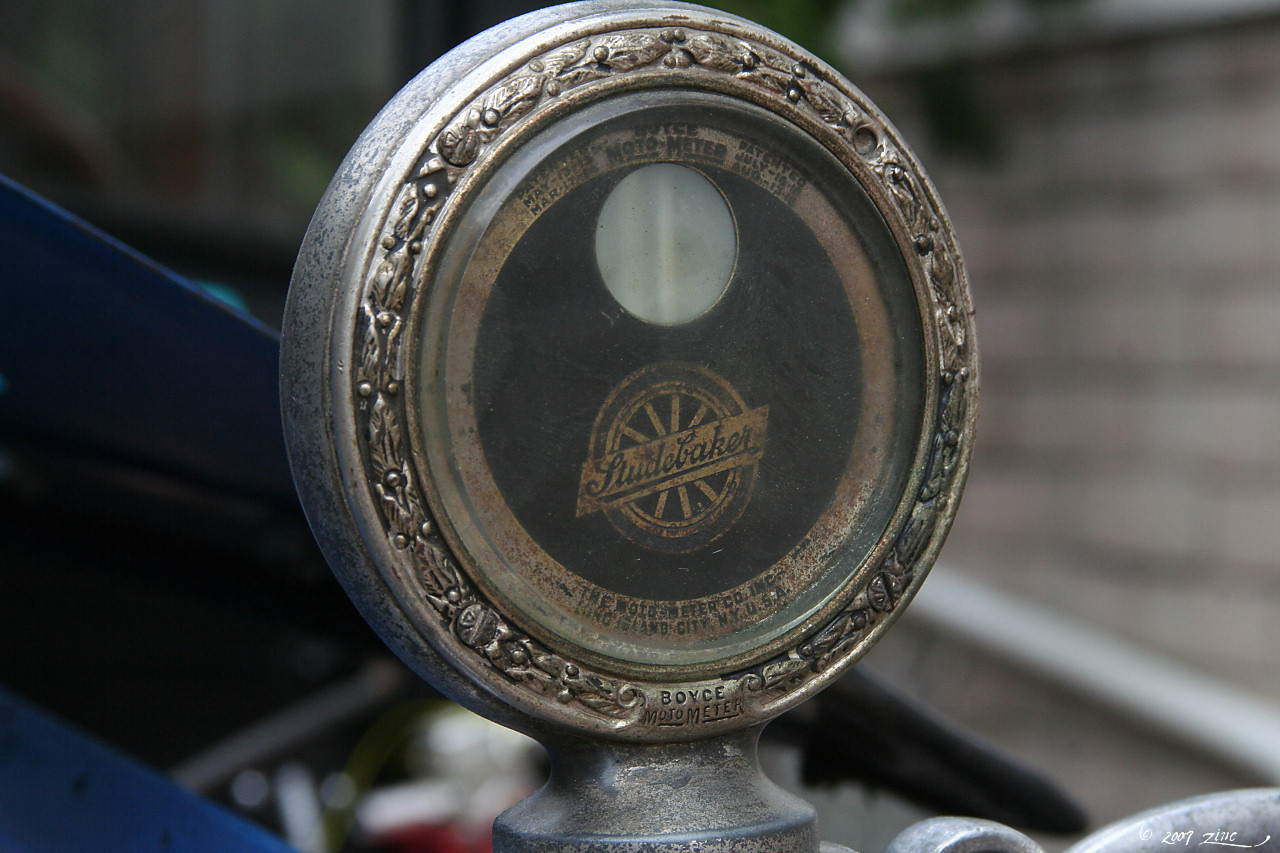
1926 Boyce Moto-Meter

New car price included the following items:

- Boyce MotoMeter
- automatic windshield cleaner
- shock absorbers
- inspection lamp and cord
- bumpers front and rear
- spare tire
- rear view mirror
- headlight dimmer
- thief-proof lock

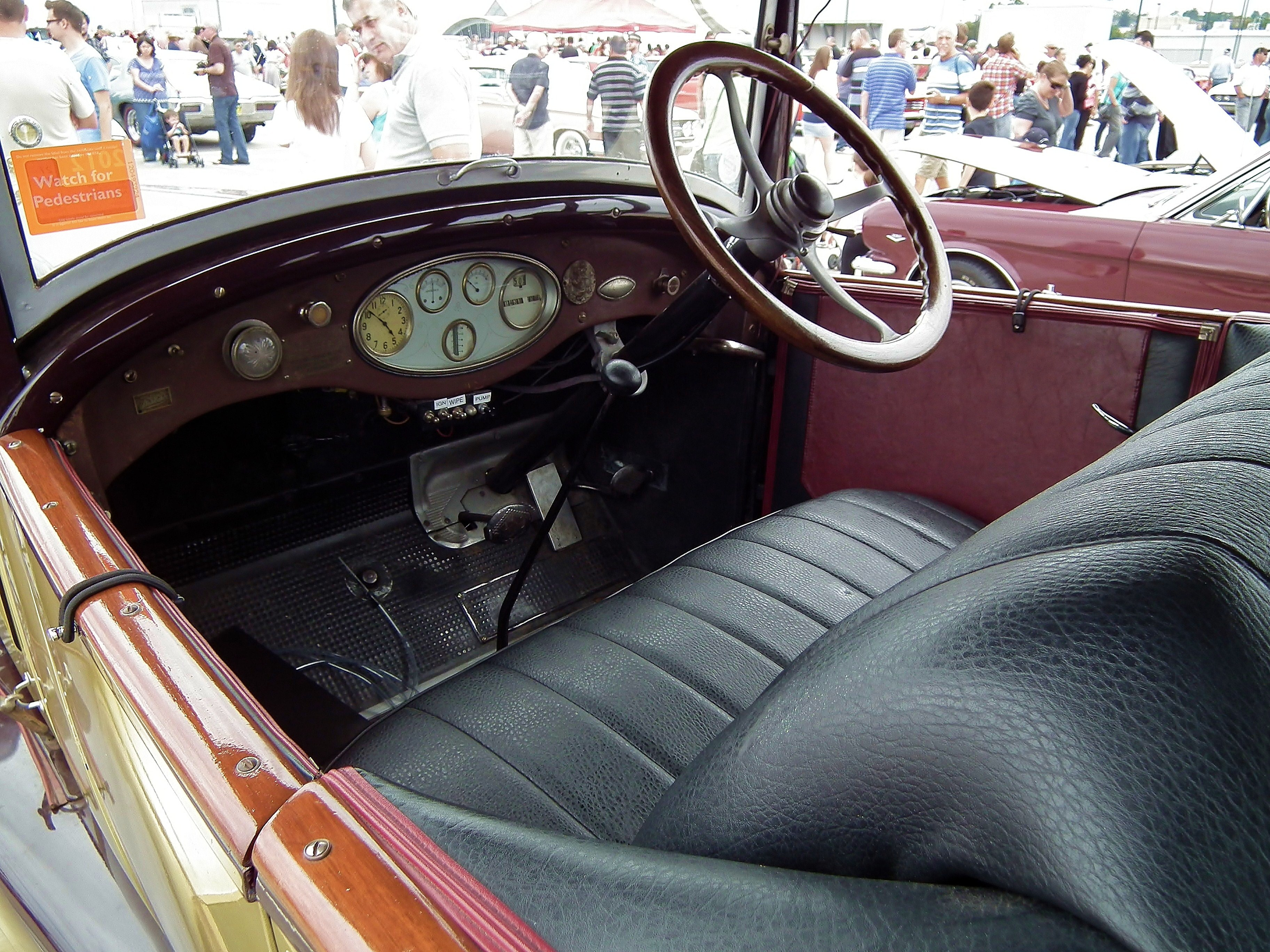
1925 interior

- clock
- smoking case
- vanity case
- dome light and corner lights

=== Optional equipment ===
The following was available in new models at an extra cost:

- Hydraulic four-wheel brakes with disc wheels
- Spare wheel

== See also ==
- Carl Breer

== Sources ==
- Slauson, H. W.; Howard Greene (1926). ""Leading American Motor Cars"". Everyman's Guide to Motor Efficiency. New York: Leslie-Judge Company.
