= Studebaker Commander =

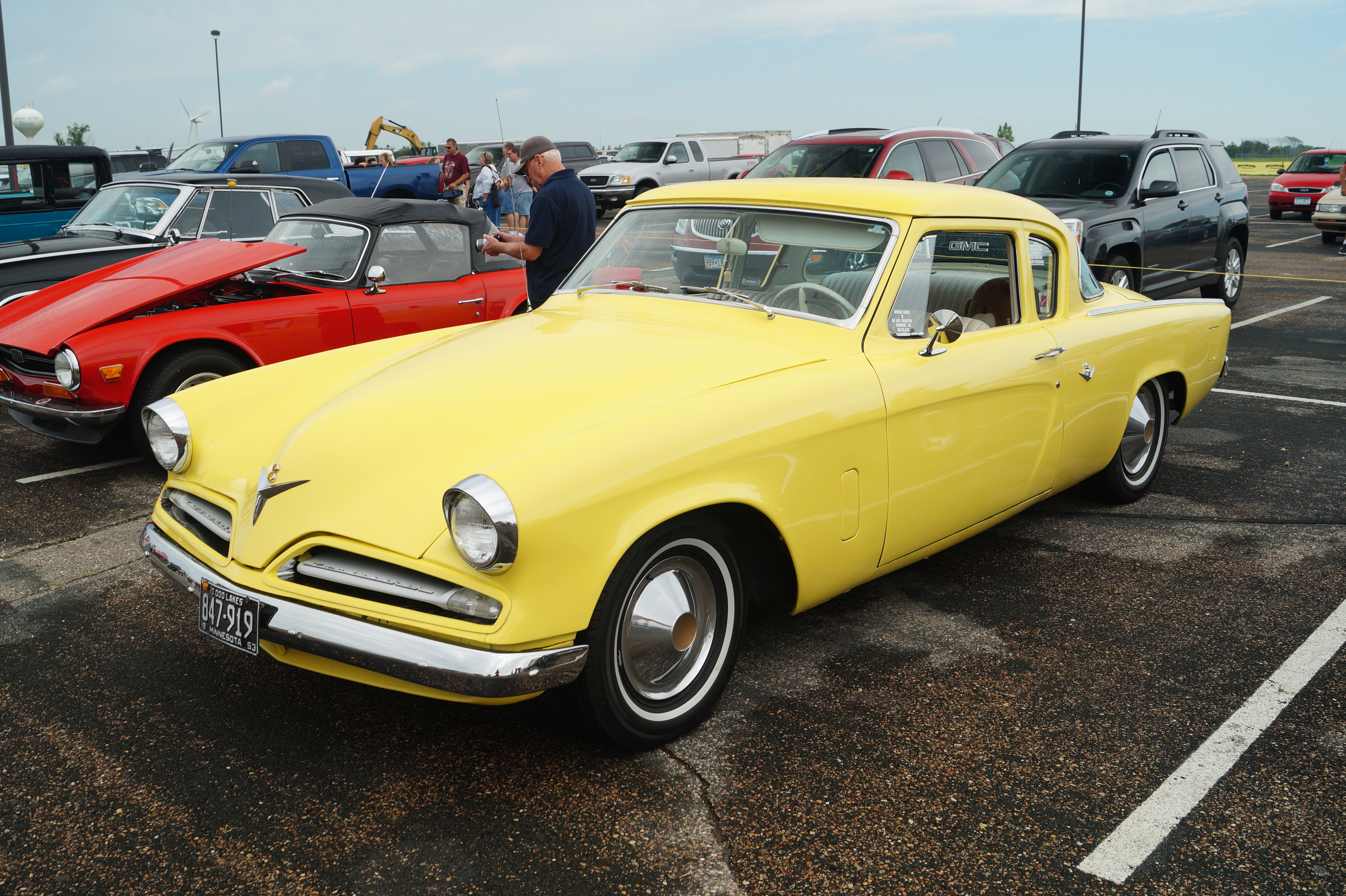
- 1953 Studebaker Commander Starlight coupe

Overview
- Manufacturer: Studebaker
- Model years: 1927–1942, 1947–1966
- Assembly: Studebaker Automotive Plant, South Bend, Indiana, United States

Body and chassis
- Class: mid-size
- Layout: Front-engine, rear-wheel-drive

Chronology
- Predecessor: Studebaker Special Six

The Studebaker Commander is the model name of several automobiles produced by the Studebaker Corporation of South Bend, Indiana (United States) and Studebaker of Canada Ltd of Walkerville and, later, Hamilton, Ontario (Canada). Studebaker began using the Commander name in 1927 and, with interruptions in 1936 and 1959-63, continued to use it until 1964. The name was applied to various products in the company's line-up from year to year. The Commander was the company's mainstream product, the Studebaker Champion was the junior model, and other models were short lived or renamed as market conditions required.

== History ==
=== 1920s ===
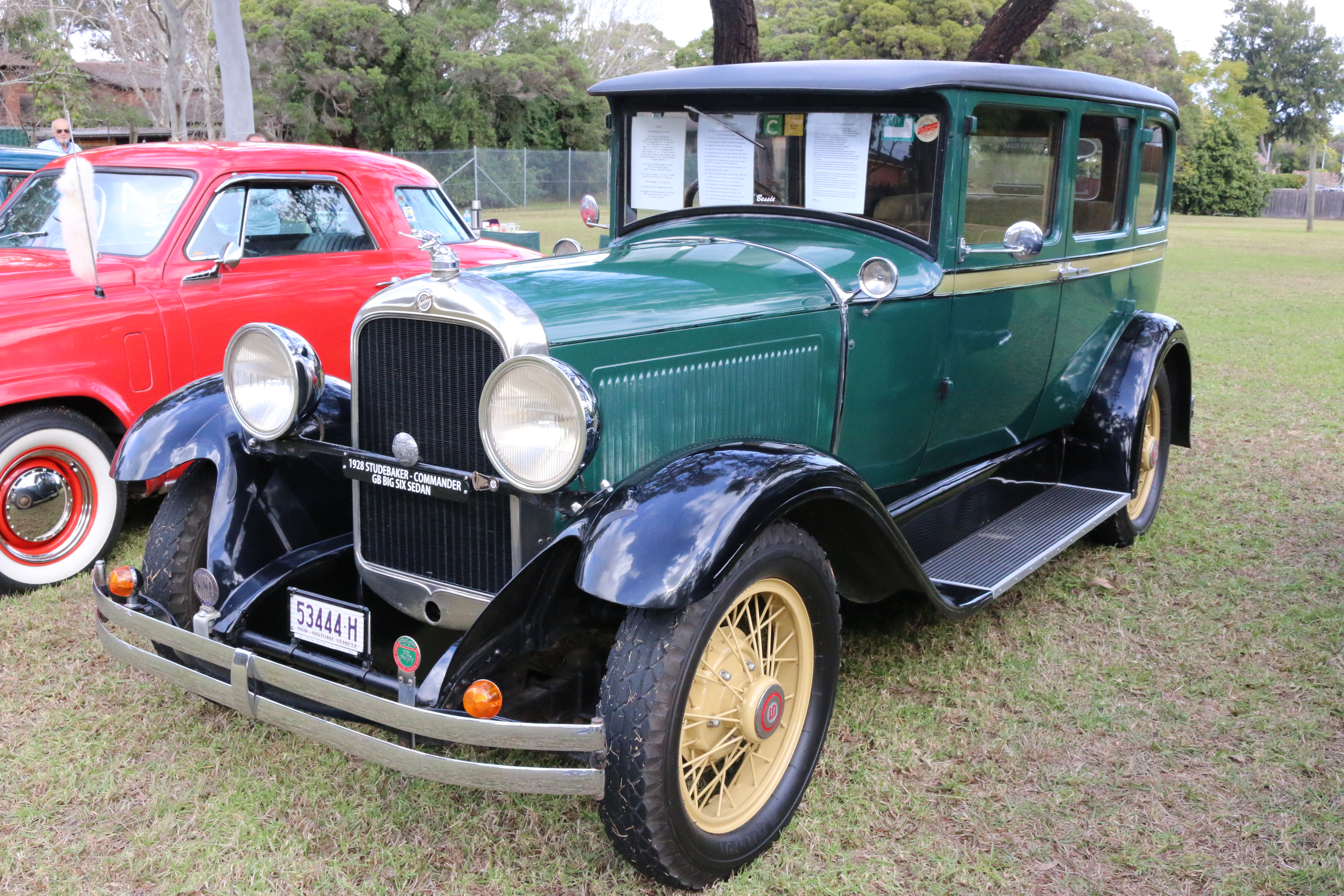
1928 Studebaker Commander GB Big Six Sedan

Until the appearance of the inline eight President in January 1928, all Studebaker cars of the 1920s were inline sixes. There were three basic models — the Light Six, the Special Six and the Big Six, developing 40 bhp (30 kW; 41 PS), 50 bhp (37 kW; 51 PS), and 60 bhp (45 kW; 61 PS) respectively at 2000 rpm. The first Commander, in 1927, was a continuation of the mid-range Special Six, with a 226 cu in (3.7 L) engine. Their inbuilt durability and toughness gained them great renown under worldwide conditions. The 1928 GB Commander was a descendant of the Big Six, being powered with the proven 354 cu in (5.8 L) engine, modified to deliver 75 bhp (56 kW; 76 PS) at 2400 rpm. In October 1928, three Commander sixes lined up at the Atlantic City Speedway to challenge the 15,000 mi (24,000 km) speed record (64.25 mph (103.40 km/h)) held by the much higher-priced Auburn straight-eight Speedster.

They not only accomplished that but then went on to establish new records up to 25,000 miles (40,000 km). The two sports roadsters averaged better than 65 mph (105 km/h) and the sedan, which had flipped on the icy boards during one of the night runs and had been hurriedly repaired, averaged almost 62 mph.

After this, the three cars were closely scrutinised, part by part, and it was established that they were strictly stock automobiles, identical in every respect to those available at any Studebaker showroom.

In Australia, a crew of three drivers led by Norman "Wizard" Smith tackled overland records using a Commander roadster. On a 3,000-mile run from Fremantle to Sydney, they smashed the previous record by 12 hours 23 minutes despite traversing 450 miles through blinding rain, and having to ford a river when a bridge had been washed away. The team rested for a little over three hours before attempting another record on the 600-mile track to Brisbane.

These sixes were the last descendants of rugged cars designed for poor roads in the early 20th century—loaded with torque and strong in construction. They were less well suited to the higher cruising speeds made possible by better roads in later years.

In 1929, Studebaker added an 8-cylinder Commander to the range.

=== 1930s ===
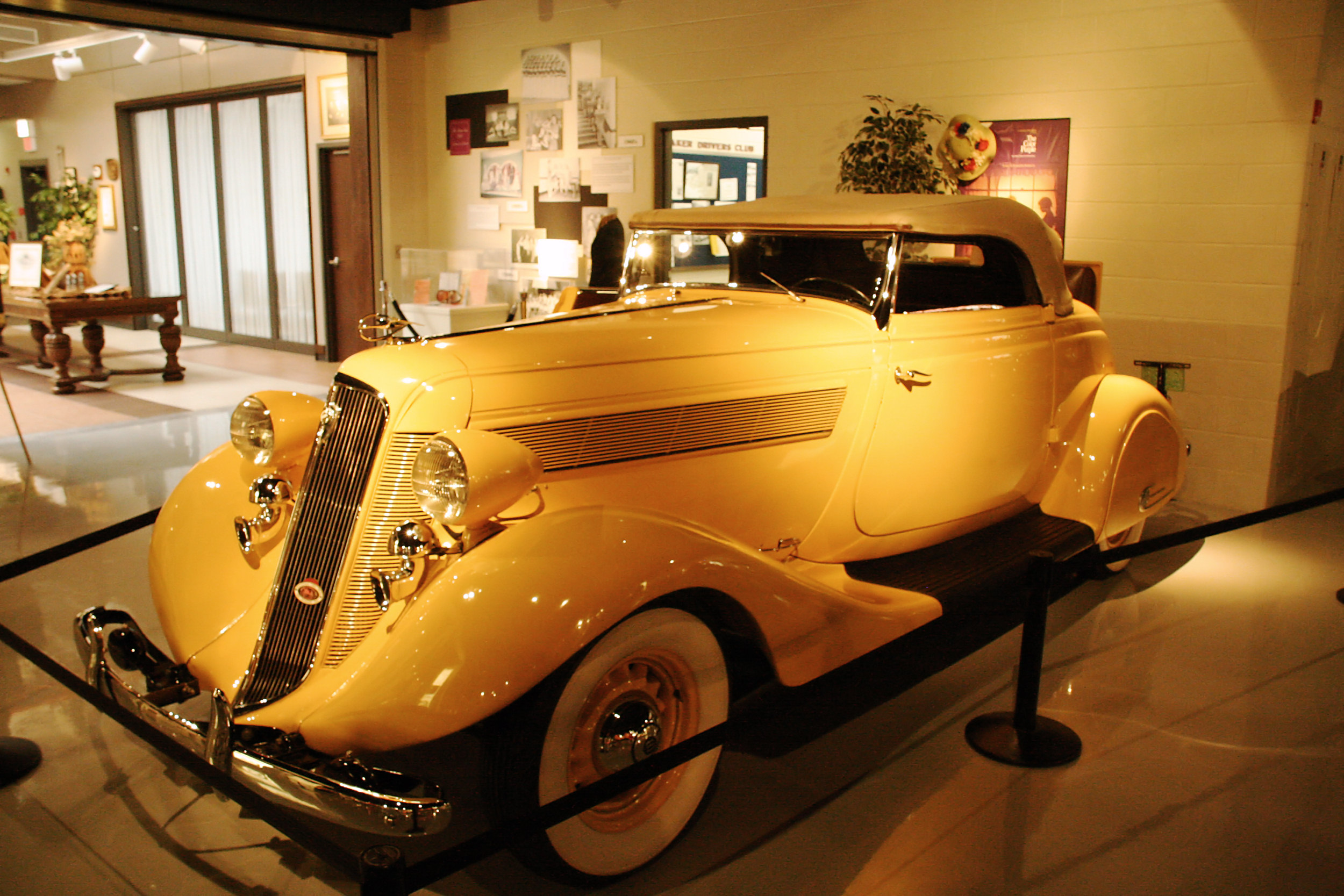
1935 Commander roadster

In 1935, the Commander was dropped from Studebaker’s product line, only to be reinstated in 1937 when the name was applied to Studebaker’s least expensive model, formerly known as the Studebaker Dictator. Studebaker introduced the Champion in 1939, and the Commander line was again repositioned, now as the mid-range vehicle.

=== 1940s ===
Immediately following World War II, Studebaker dropped its President models, and the Commander again was elevated in the lineup. Studebaker also again rolled out an extended wheelbase model of the Commander, the Land Cruiser.

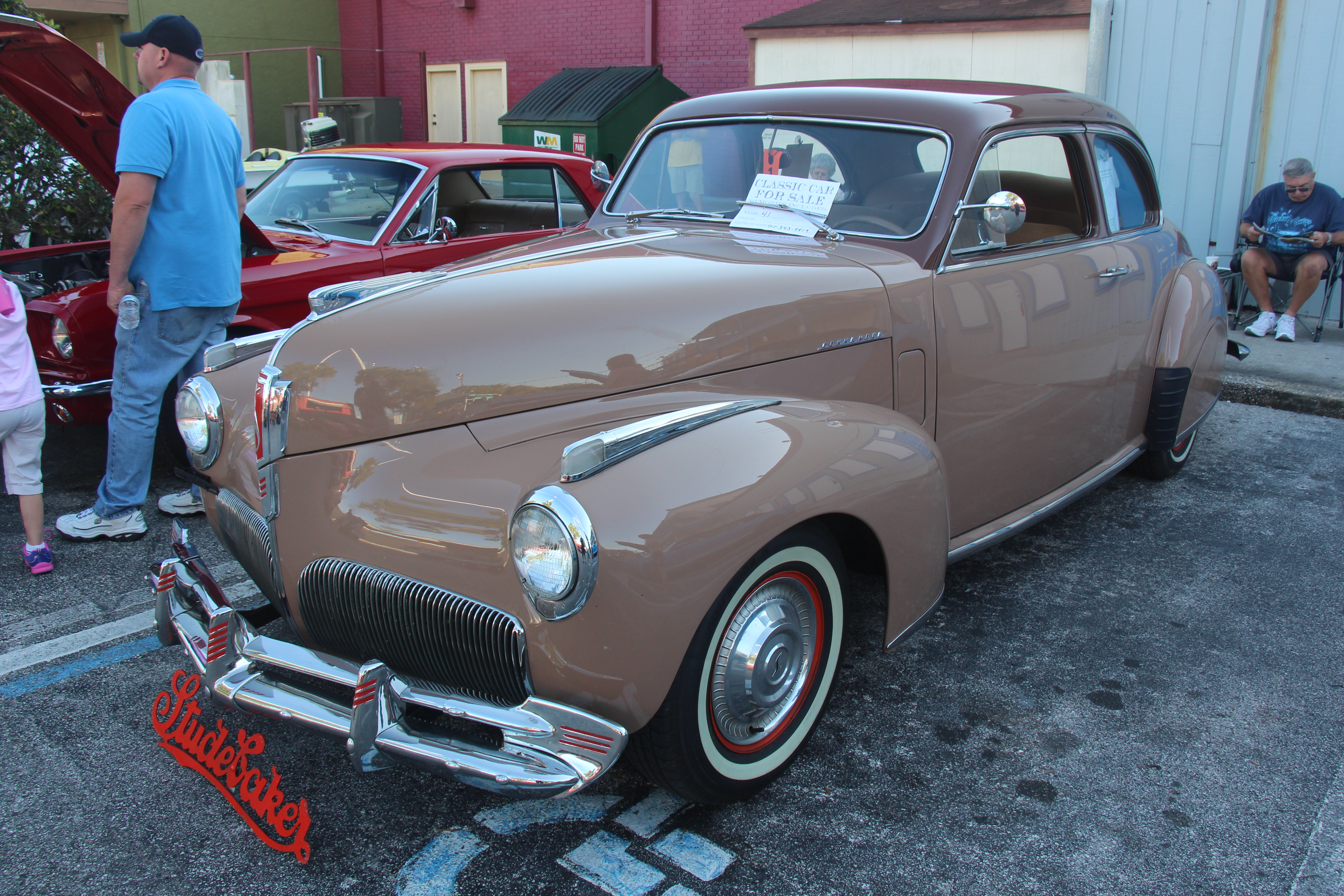
1941 Studebaker Commander Sedan-Coupe

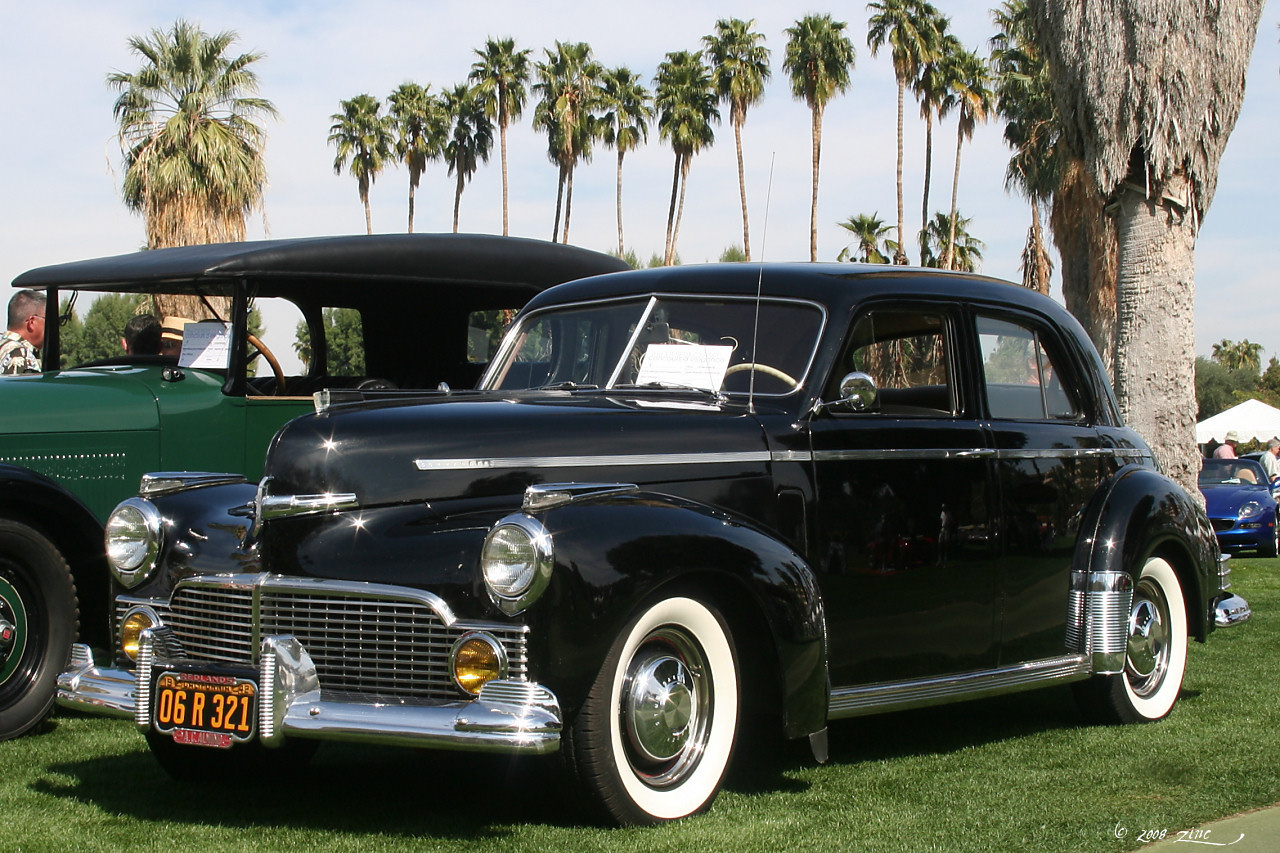
1942 Commander Custom Cruising Sedan

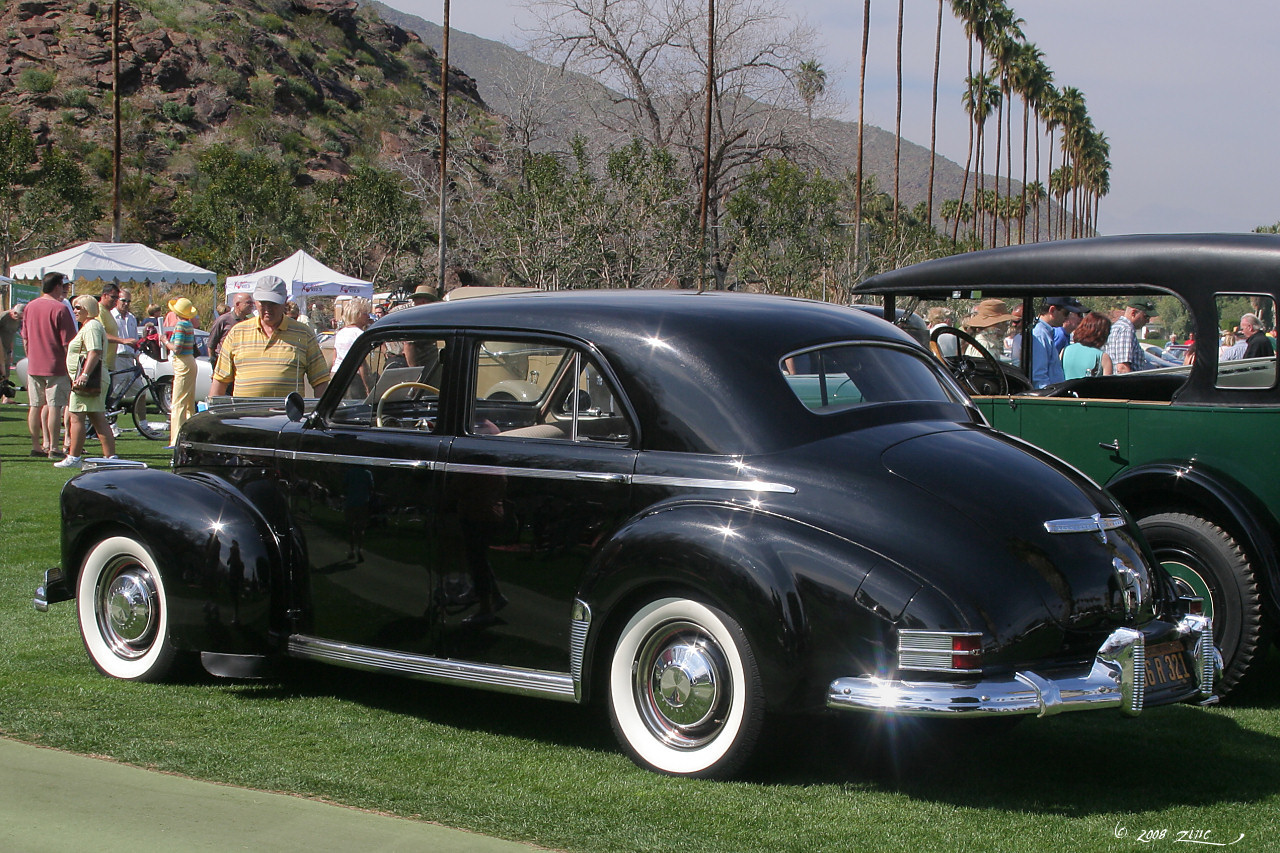
1942 Commander Custom Cruising Sedan

Raymond Loewy's highly distinctive shape for the 1947 Commander and Champion, spectacular on their Starlight coupe, led if it did not create a boom in America's trunk space.

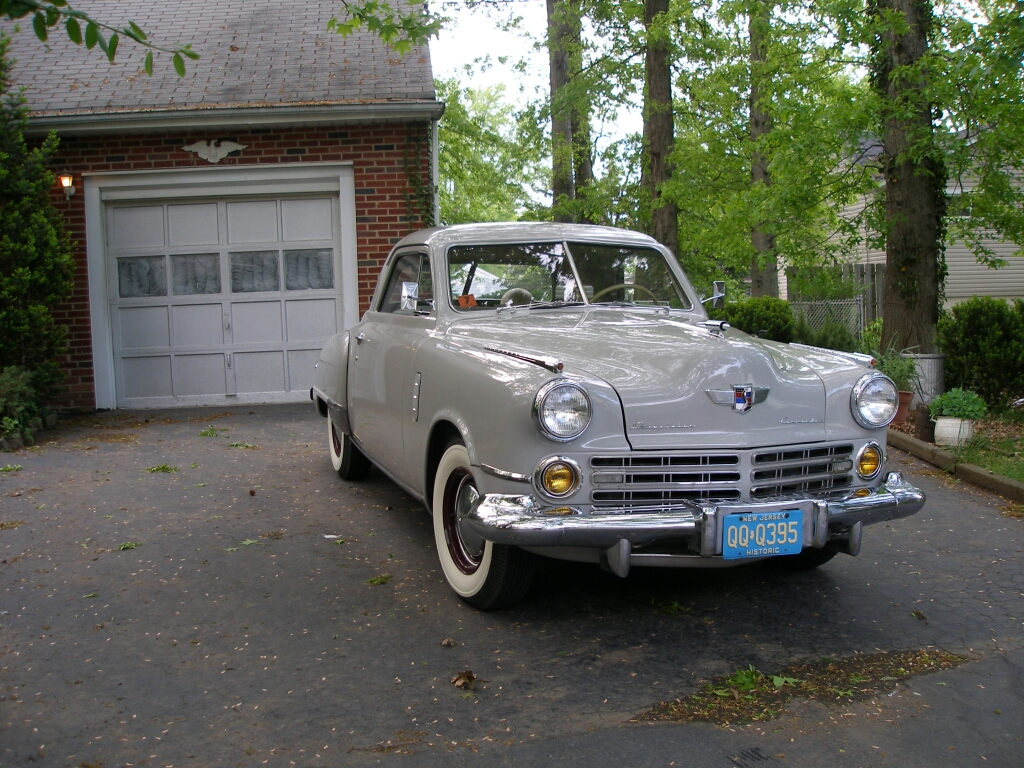
1947 Commander 2 Door, 3 Passenger Regal Deluxe Business Coupe (14A-Q2)

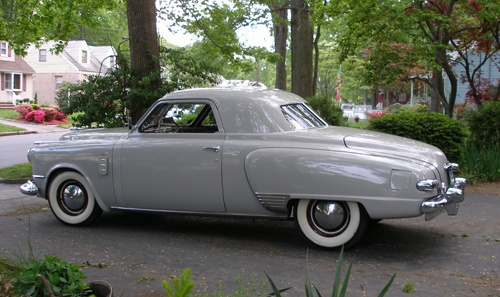
Regal Deluxe Business Coupe

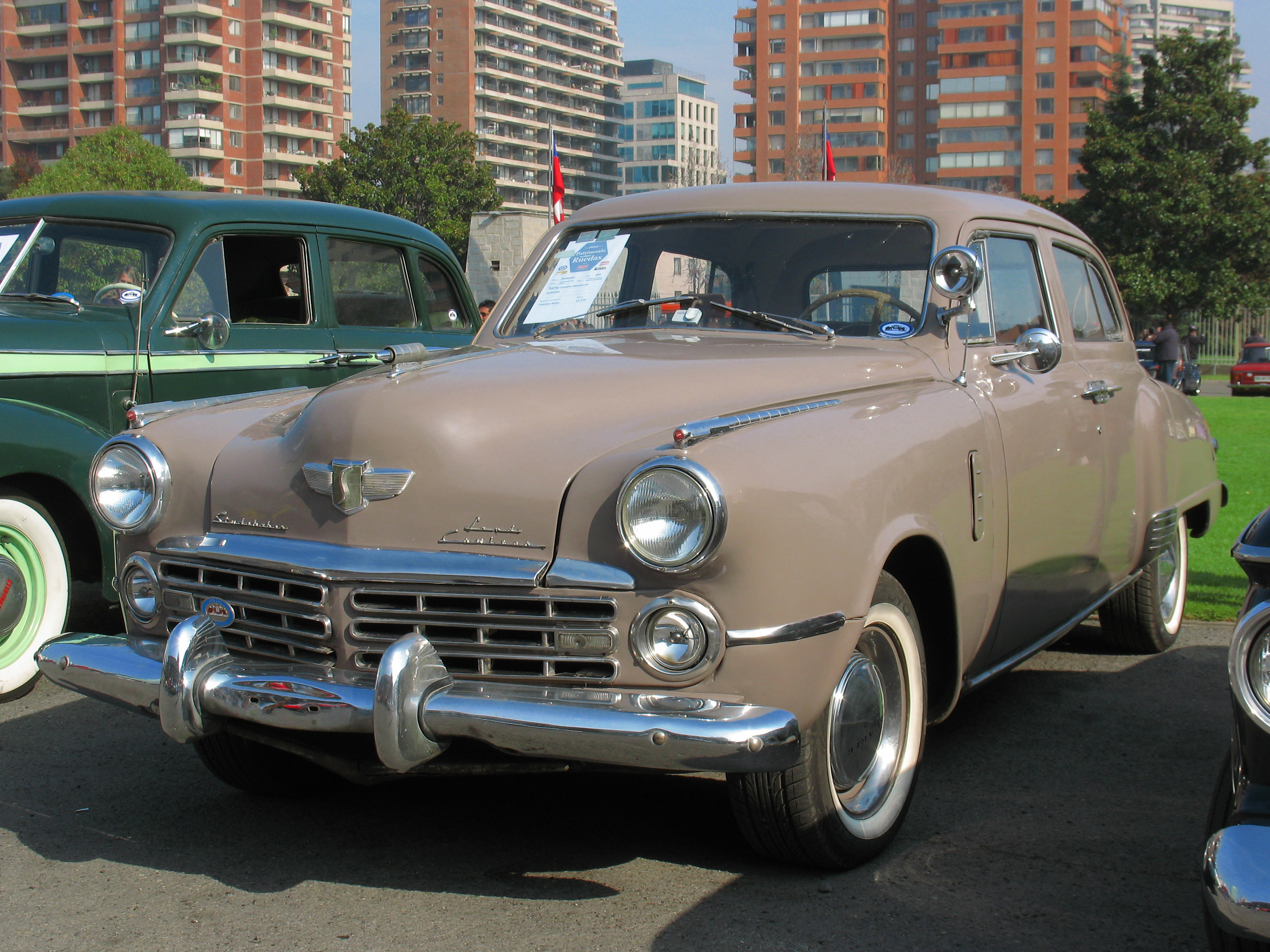
1948 Studebaker Commander Land Cruiser

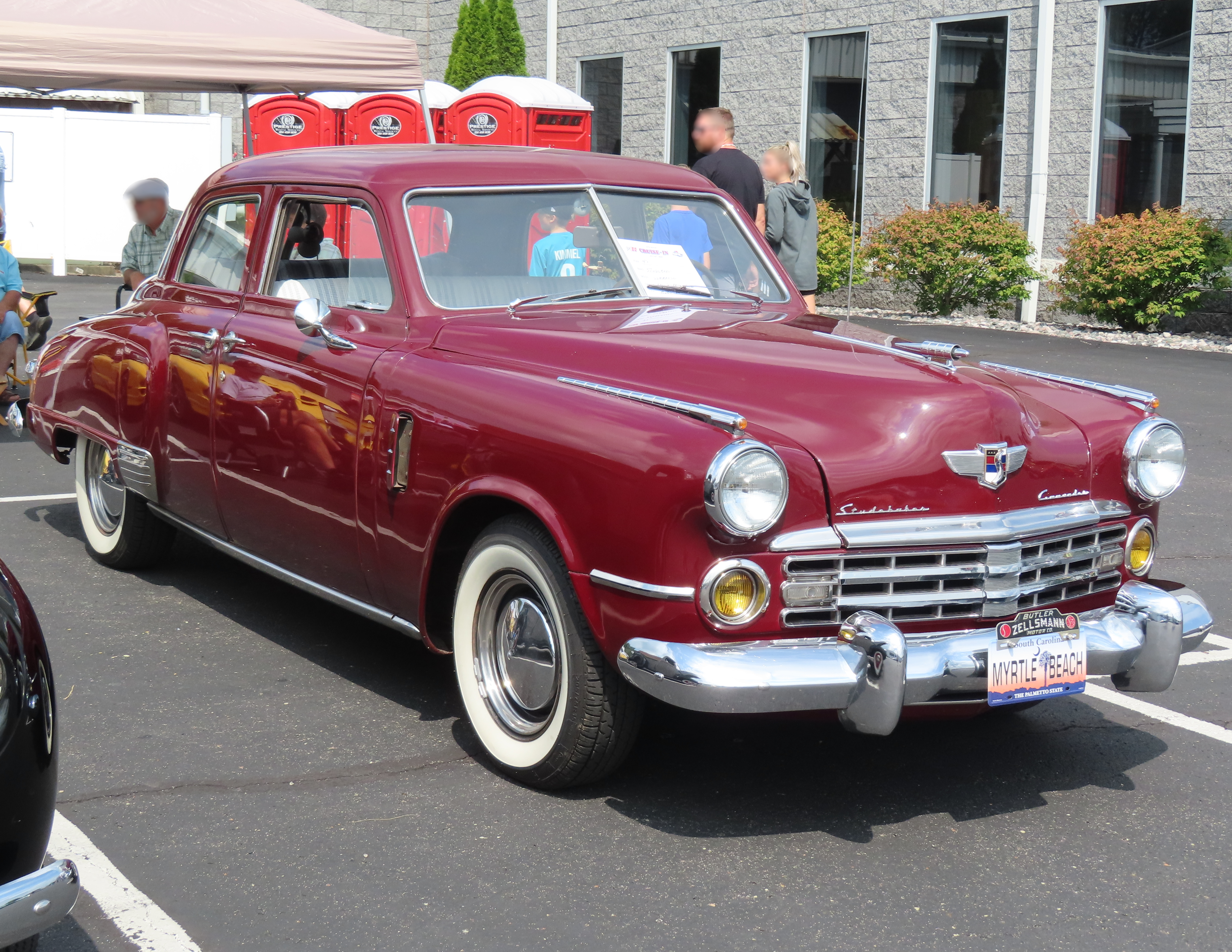
1949 Studebaker Commander Regal De Luxe 4-door Sedan

=== 1950s ===
The 1950 Champion differed from the Commander, which had a distinctive bumper, carried over from 1949, longer front fenders and large headlight bezels, as well as a distinctive jet-style hood ornament and shared an appearance with the 1949 Ford Sedan. In 1953, the polarizing appearance was updated and shares some appearance features with the Citroen DS that appeared in 1955.

In a 1953 road test done by Popular Mechanics, the Commander got a 0-60 mph of 17.9 seconds and was rated as getting 26.1 mpg at 30 mph.

No convertible was offered in 1953. However, in late 1952 Studebaker produced one prototype of a 1953 Commander convertible to determine if the model could be profitably mass-produced. The car was based on the 1953 2-door Starliner hardtop. The car was later modified to 1954-model specifications, and was occasionally driven around South Bend by engineers. Additional structural reinforcements were needed to reduce body flexure. Even though the car was equipped with the 232 cu. in. V-8, the added structural weight increased the car's 0-60 mph acceleration time to an unacceptable level. In addition, the company did not have the financial resources to add another body type to the model line.

The company's leadership mistakenly thought the 2-door sedans, 4-door sedans, and 1954 Conestoga wagon would sell better than the 2-door coupes, so the company's resources were focused on production of the sedans and the wagon. When the prototype convertible was no longer needed, engineer E. T. Reynolds ordered the car to be stripped and the body sent to the secret graveyard at the company's proving grounds west of South Bend. A non-engineering employee requested permission to purchase the complete car, rather than see it rot away at the proving grounds with other, earlier prototypes of other cars and trucks. Chief engineer Gene Hardig discussed the request with E. T. Reynolds. They agreed to let the employee purchase the car on the condition that the employee never sell it. In the 1970s, the car was re-discovered behind a South Bend gas station and no longer owned by the former employee. After eventually passing through several owners, the car is now in a private collection of Studebaker automobiles.

In 1955, Studebaker reintroduced the President name for its premium models and 'Commander' was applied to the mid-range products. The Commander line was extended with the introduction of a lower-priced Custom sub-series, being basically a Champion with a V8 engine. Studebaker placed the name on hiatus at the end of the 1958 model year.

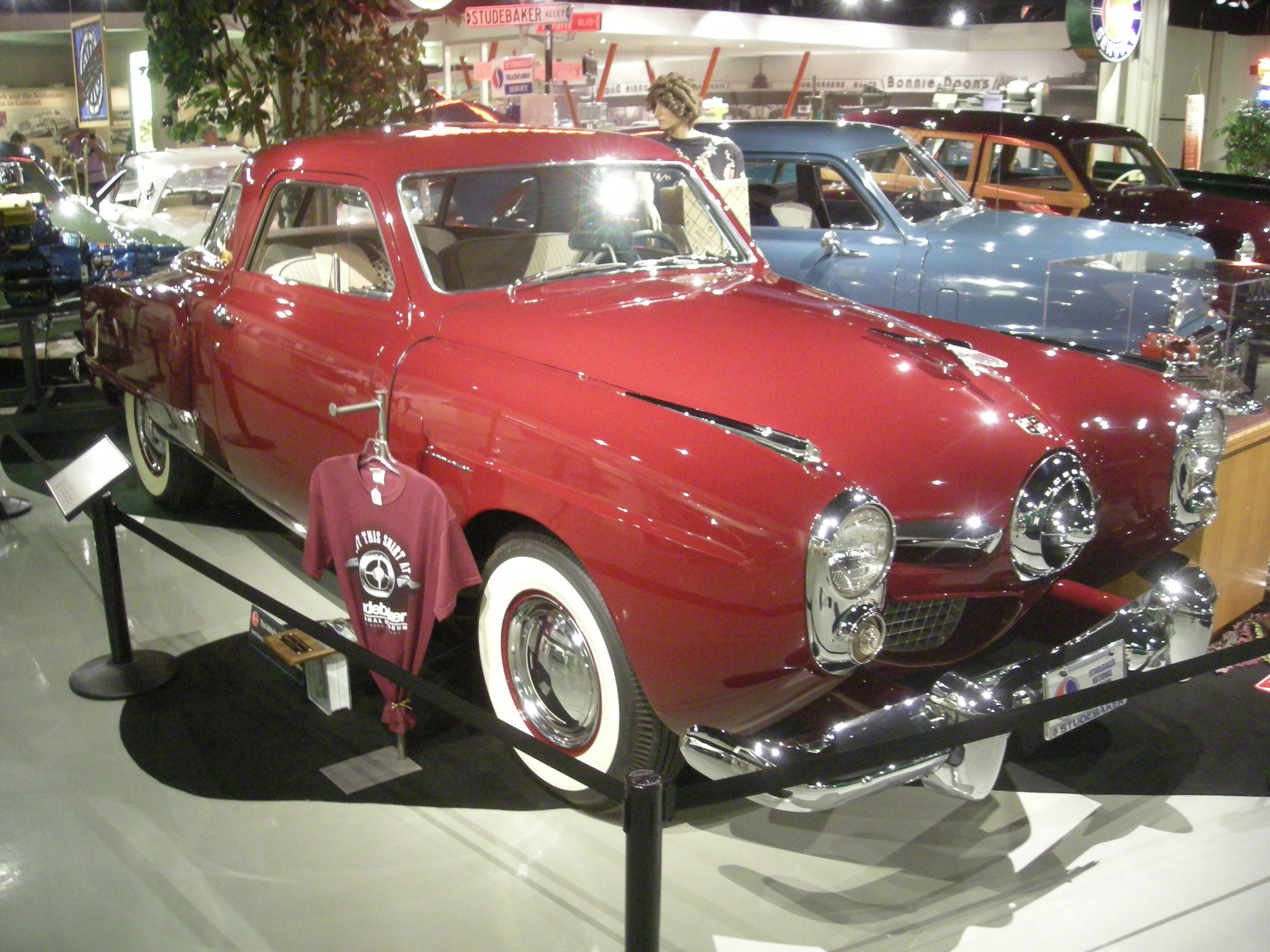
1950 Studebaker Commander Starlight Coupe

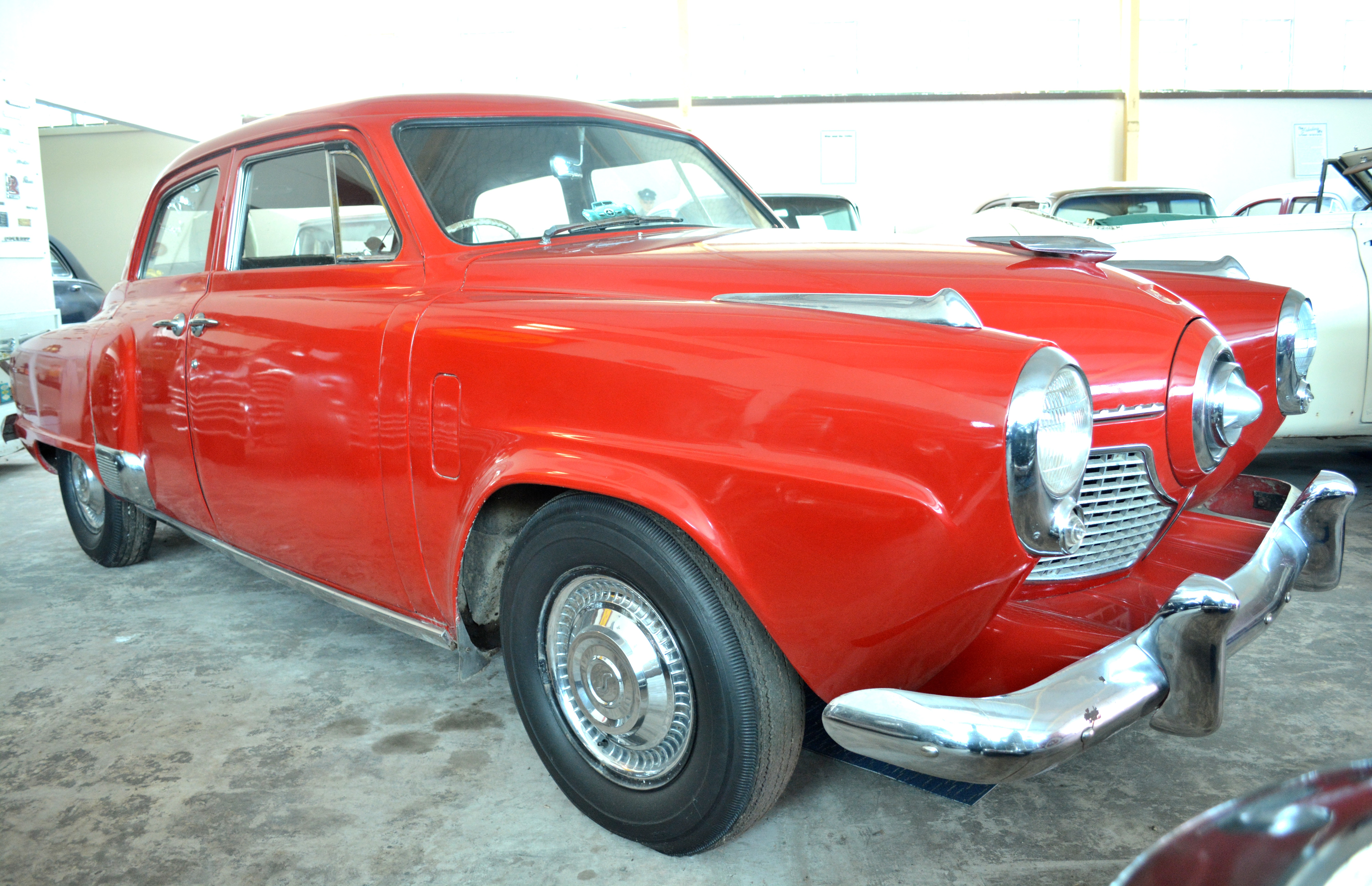
1951 Studebaker Commander State 4-Door Sedan

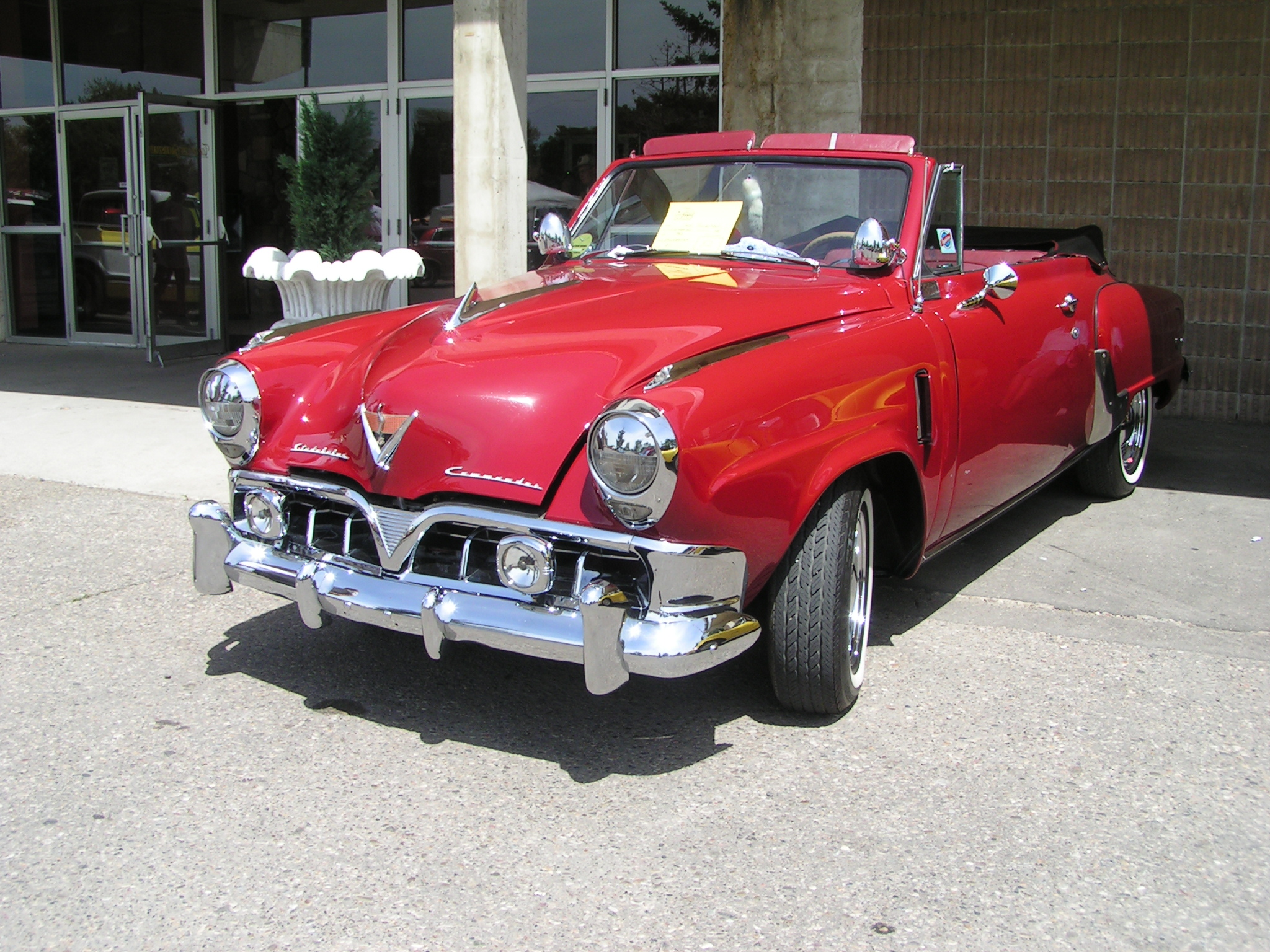
1952 Studebaker Commander State Convertible

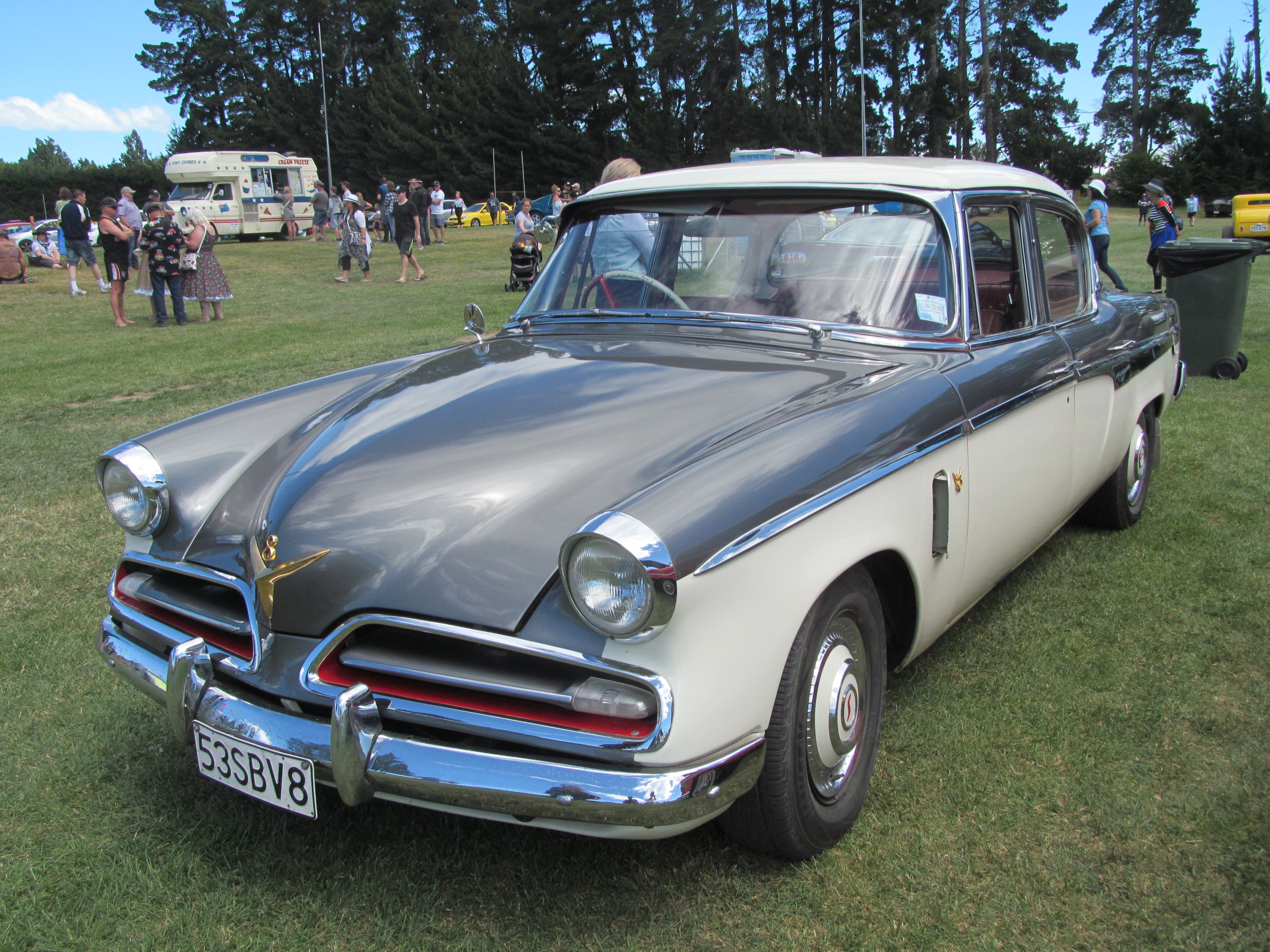
1953 Studebaker Commander V-8 Regal 4-Door Sedan

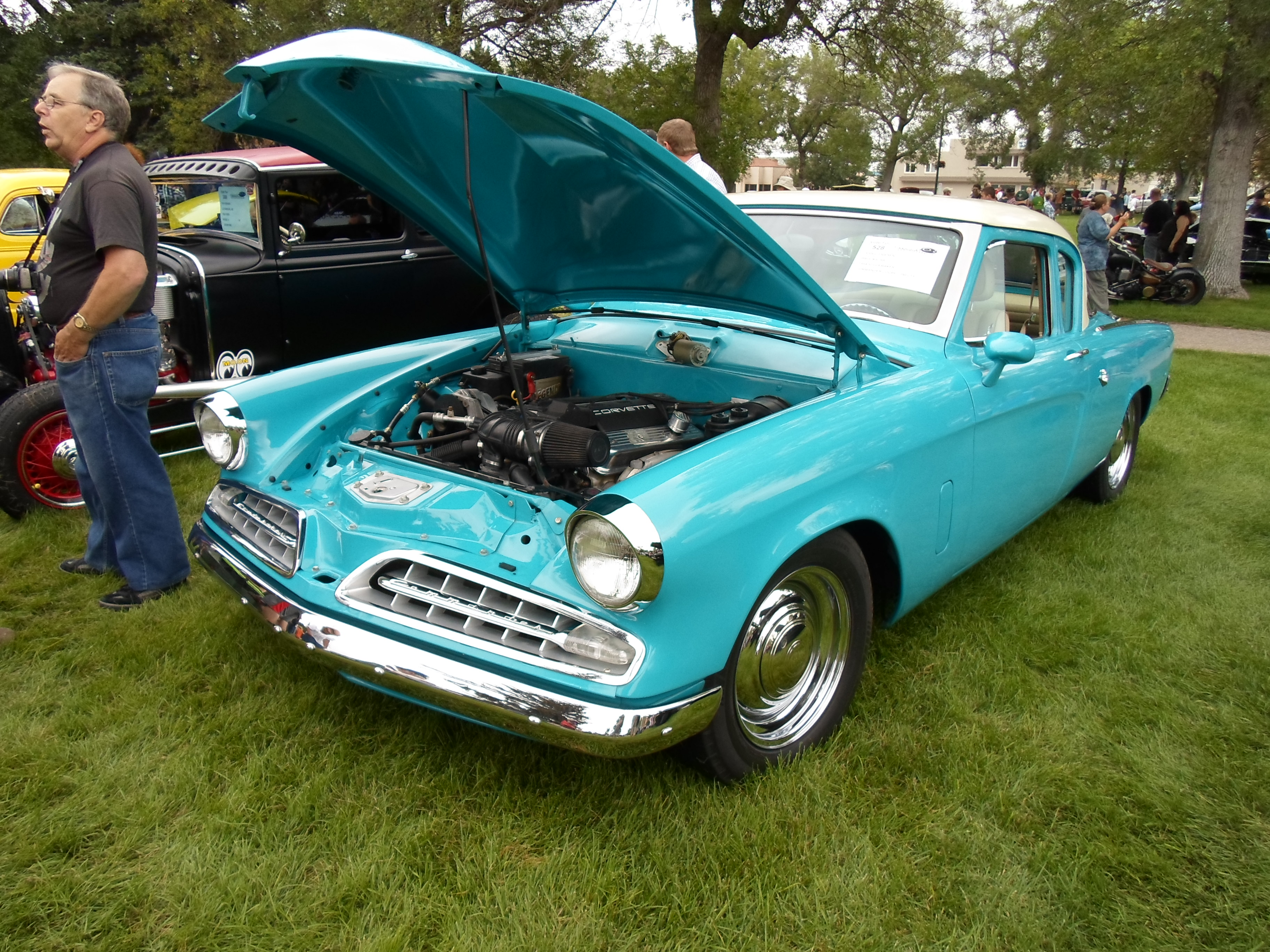
1954 Studebaker Commander V8 Deluxe Starlight Coupe

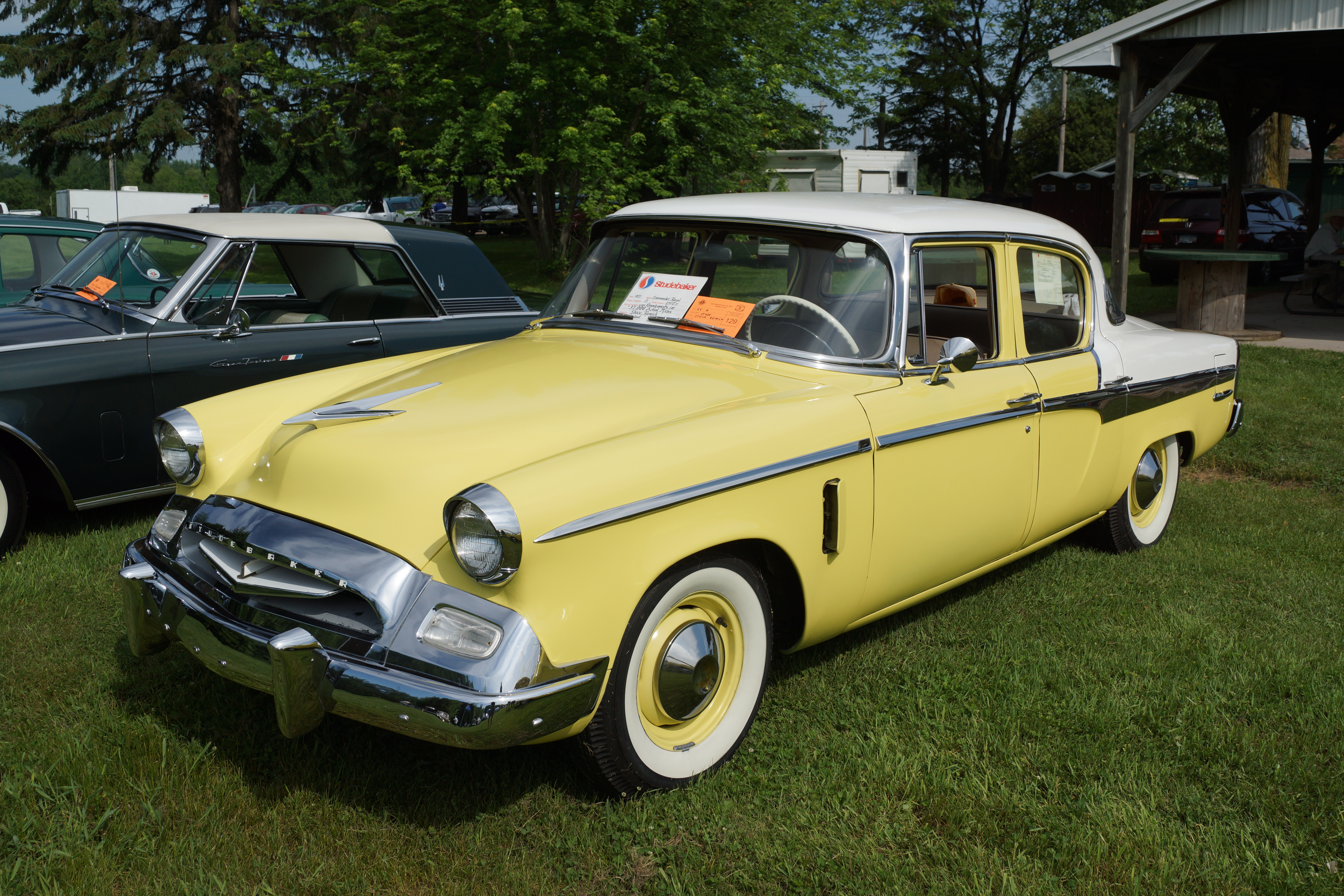
1955 Studebaker Commander V-8 Regal 4-door sedan

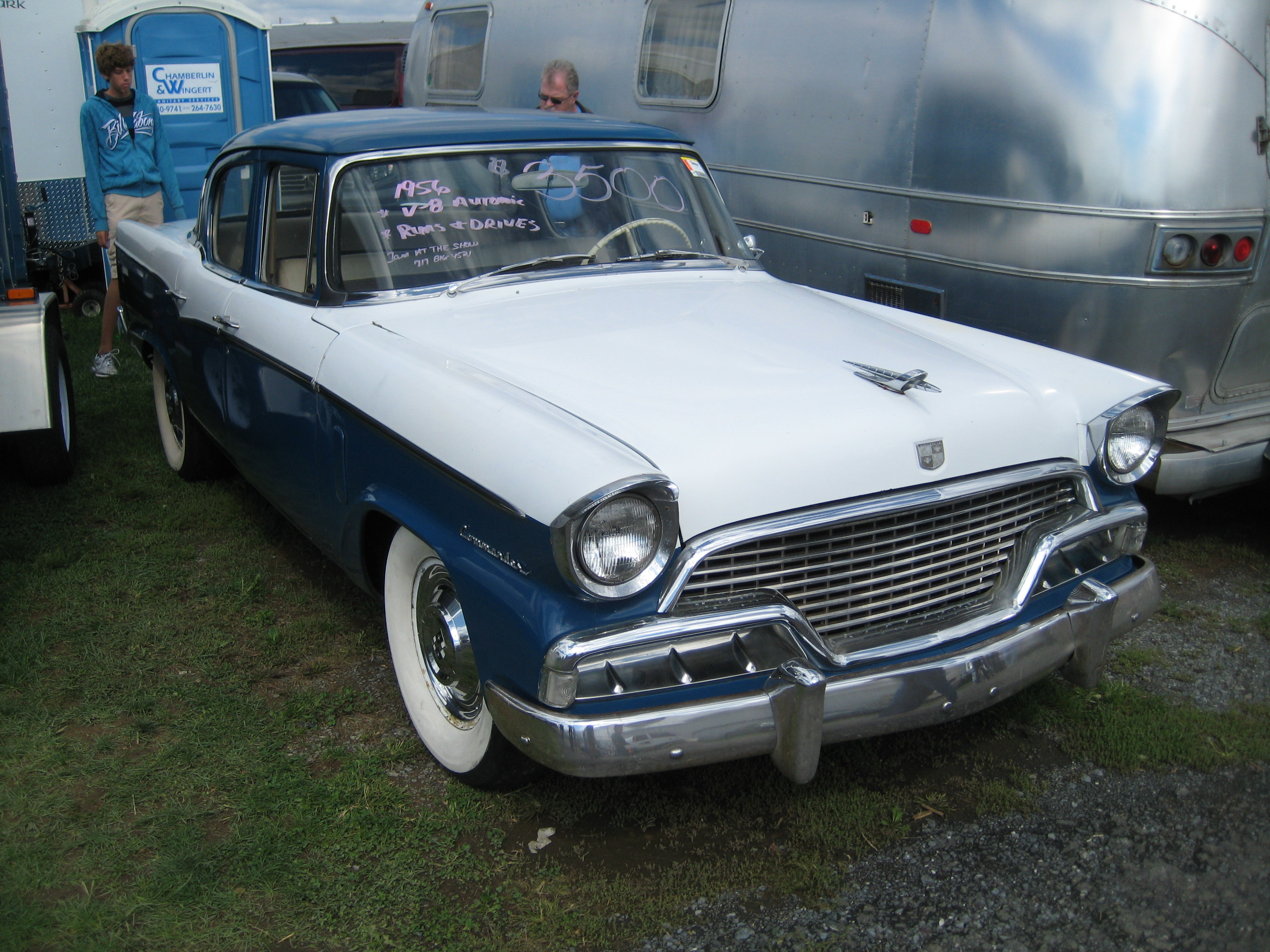
1956 Studebaker Commander 4-Door Sedan

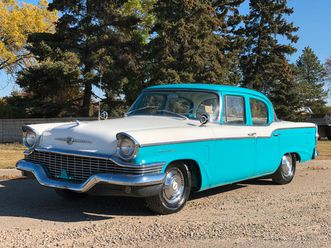
1957 Studebaker Commander DeLuxe Club Sedan

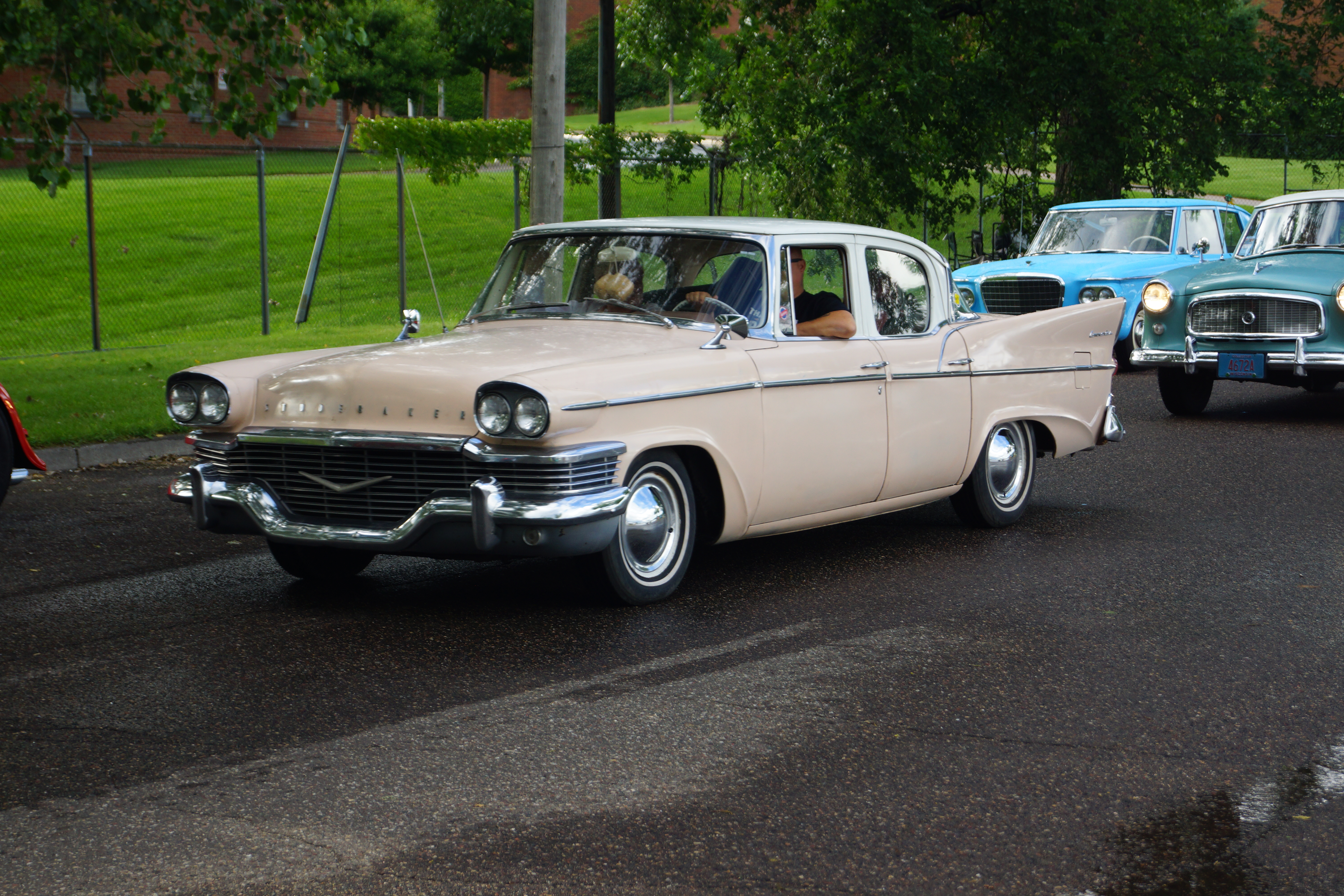
1958 Studebaker Commander

=== 1960s ===
In 1963, Studebaker again resurrected the Commander name for the 1964 model year, applying it to the next-to-lowest-priced Lark model, the Challenger being below. 1964 Studebaker Commanders most commonly had a dual headlight arrangement which they shared with the Challenger though quad headlamps were optional. The 1965 Commander shared the quad-headlight system of the Daytona and Cruiser. Commanders reverted to single headlamps in the final model year of 1966. On March 17, 1966, Studebaker shut down production of all vehicles.

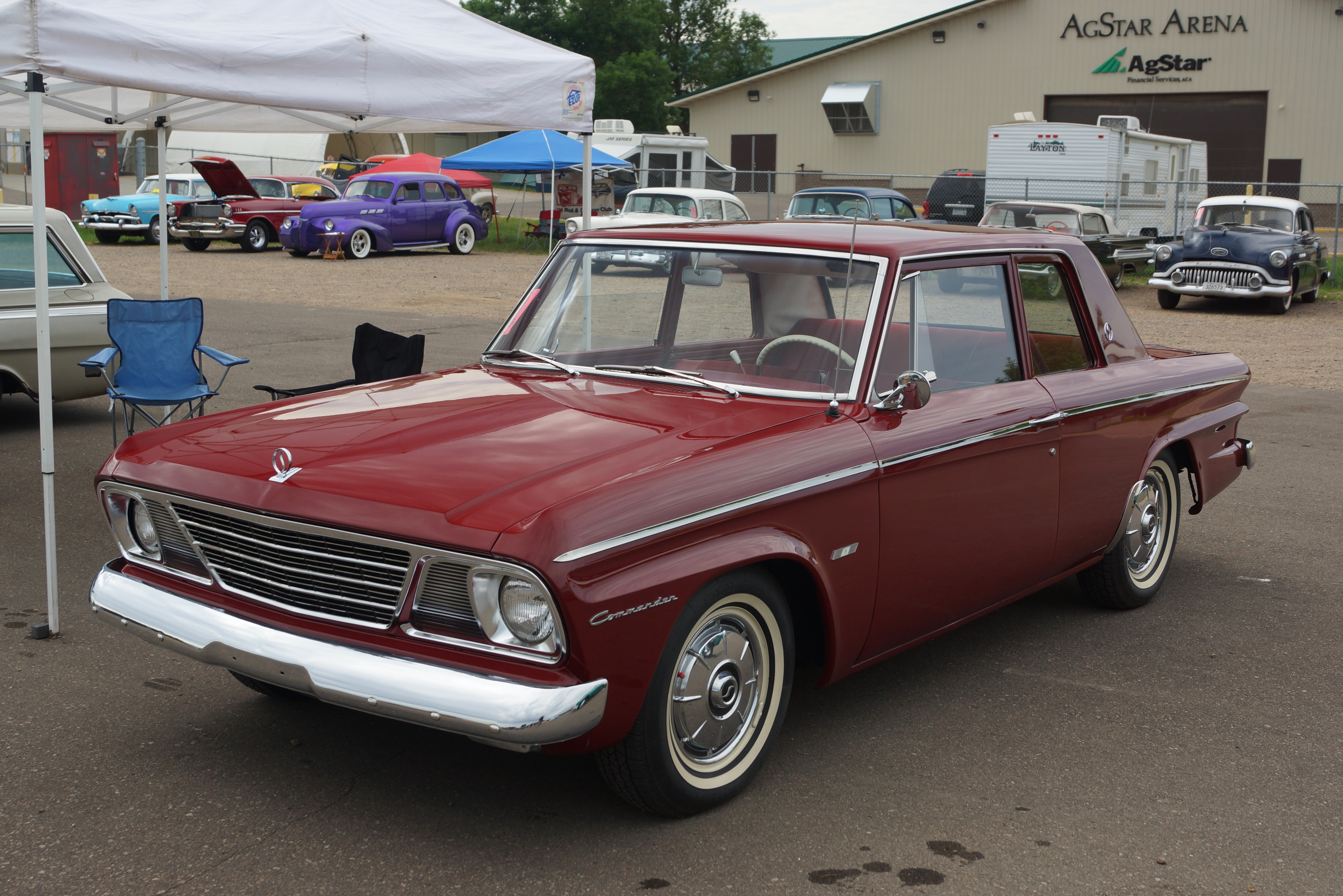
1964 Studebaker Commander 2-Door Sedan

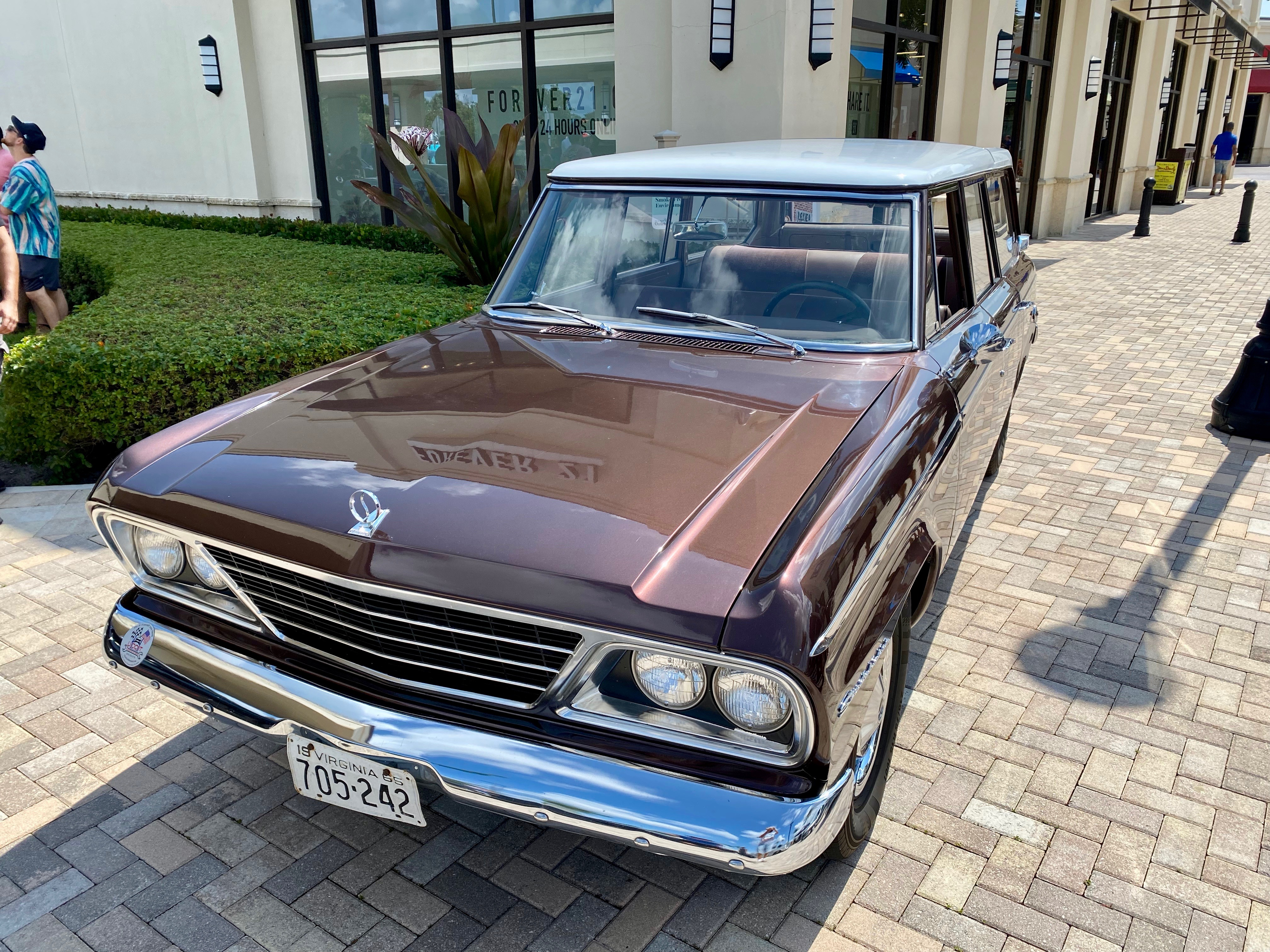
1965 Studebaker Commander Wagonaire

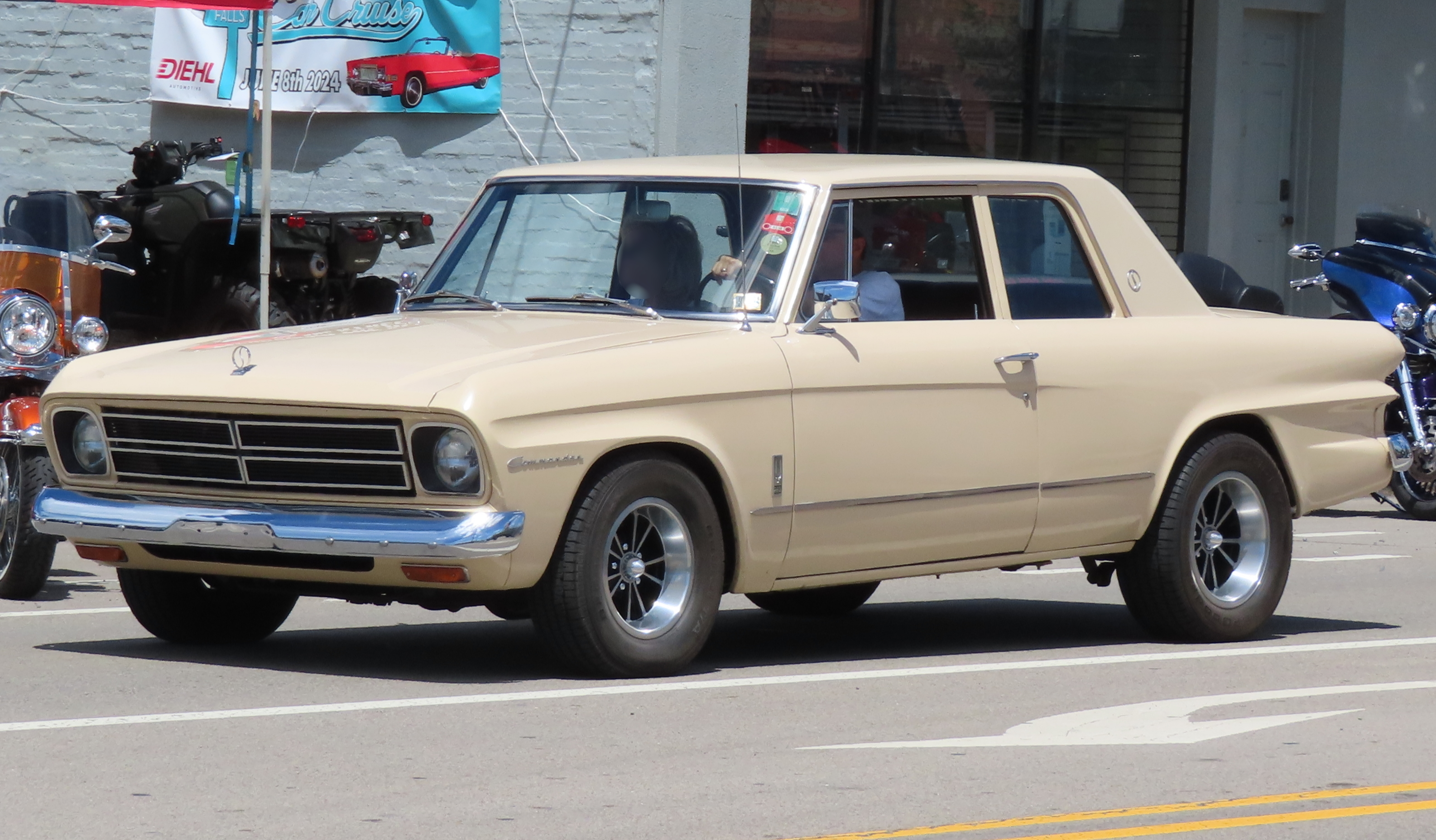
1966 Studebaker Commander 2 Door
