= Touring car =

Type of car body

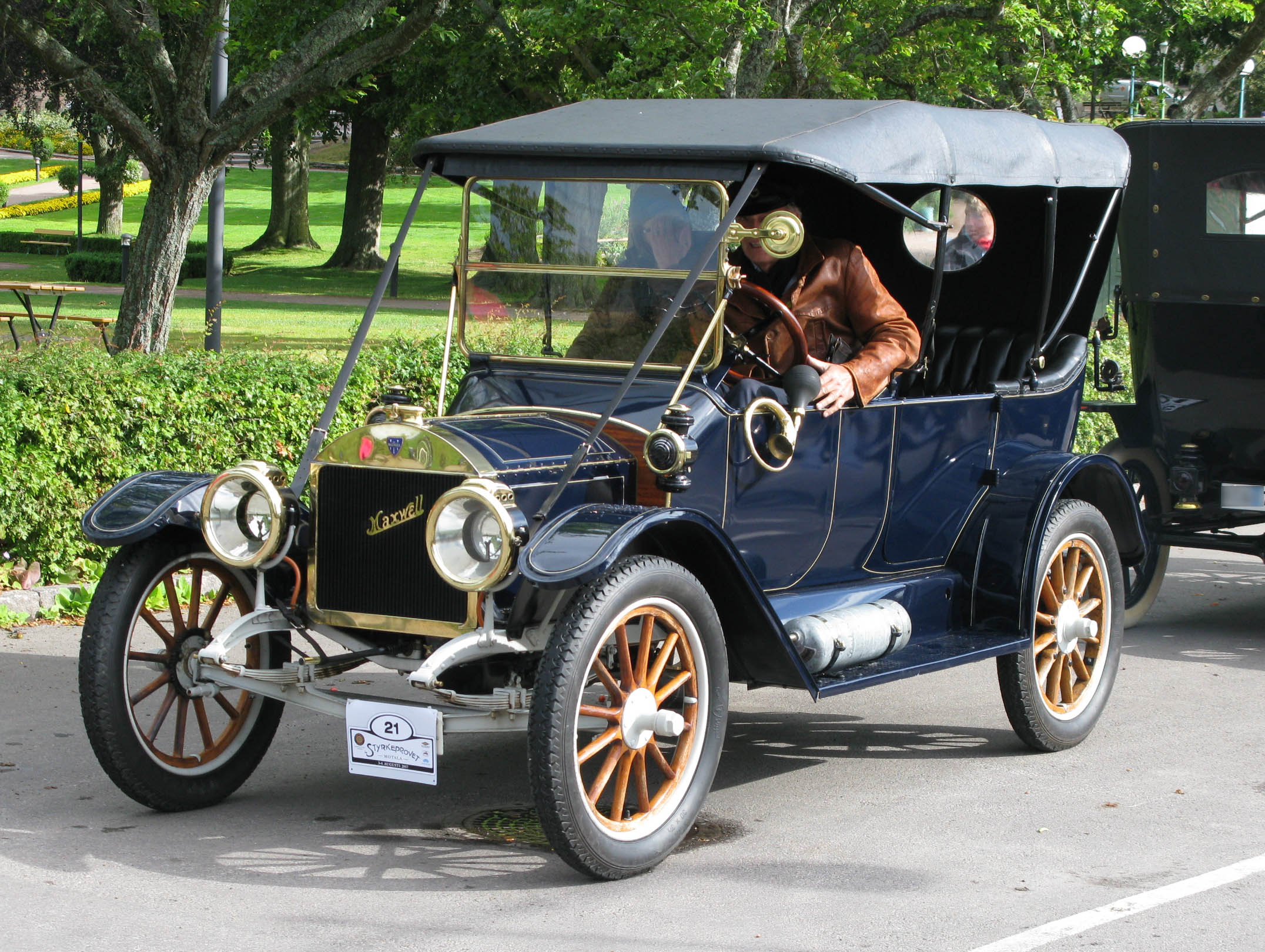
1913 Maxwell Model 24-4 touring car

Touring car and tourer are both terms for open cars (i.e. cars without a fixed roof). "Touring car" is a style of open car built in the United States which seats four or more people. The style was popular from the early 1900s to the 1930s. The cars used for touring car racing in various series since the 1960s are unrelated to these early touring cars, despite sharing the same name.

"Tourer" is used in British English for any open car. The term "all-weather tourer" was used to describe convertibles (vehicles that could be fully enclosed). A popular version of the tourer was the torpedo, with the hood/bonnet line level at the car's waistline giving the car a straight line from front to back.

== Touring car (U.S.) ==
=== Design ===
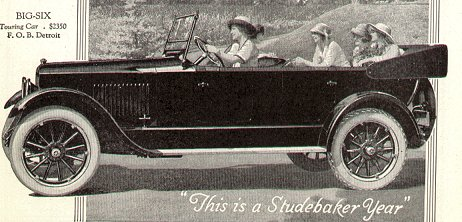
1920 Studebaker Big Six touring car with its top down. The folded top behind passengers was known as the "fan" when in the down position.

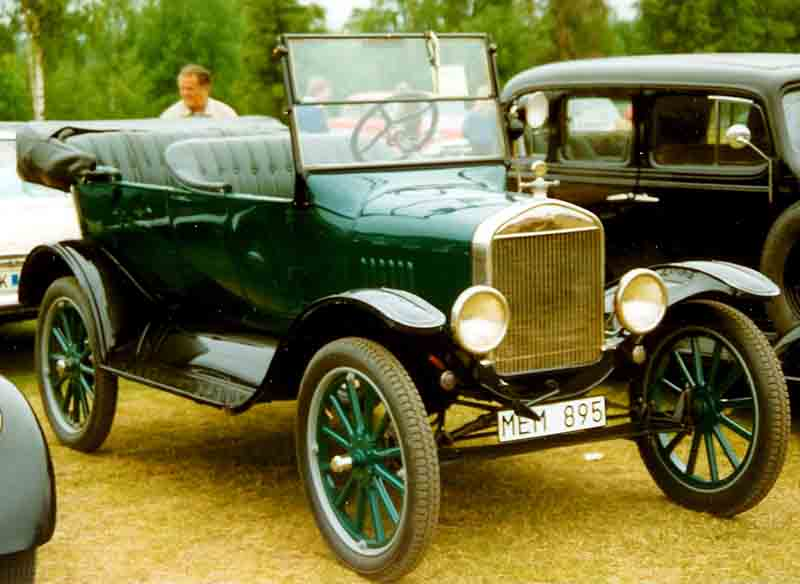
1924 Ford Model T touring car

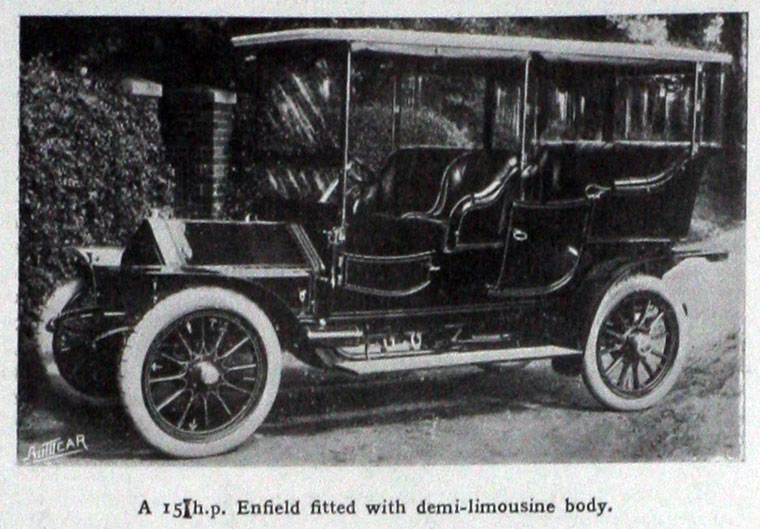
1907 Enfield 15 HP Demi-Limousine

Touring car was applied in the U.S. to open cars (cars without a fixed roof, for example convertibles) that seat four or more people and have direct entrance to the tonneau (rear passenger area), although it has also been described as seating five or more people. Touring cars may have two or four doors, and the drivetrain layouts of early touring cars was either front- or mid-engined.

When the top was folded down, it formed a bulky mass known as the fan behind the back seat: fan covers were made to protect the top and its wooden ribs while in the down position. Some touring cars were available with side curtains to protect occupants from wind and weather by snapping or zipping them into place; otherwise, the occupants had minimal weather protection.

=== History ===
The touring car body style was popular in the early 20th century, being a larger alternative to the two-seat runabout and the roadster. By the mid-1910s, the touring car body had evolved into several types, including the four-door touring car which was equipped with a convertible top.

Most of Model T's produced by Ford between 1908 and 1927 were four and then three-door models (with drivers sliding behind the wheel from passenger seat) touring cars, accounting for 6,519,643 cars sold out of the 15,000,000 estimated Model T's built. This accounted for 44% of all Model T's sold over the model's eighteen-plus year life span, making it the most popular body style.

The popularity of the touring car began to wane in the 1920s when cars with fully enclosed passenger compartments became more affordable, and began to consistently out-sell the open cars.

==== Demi-Limousine ====
For a brief time, touring sedans were offered with a solid back and permanent roof, unlike the roof on a touring sedan which could be folded back and stowed. Neither version offered permanent protection from the elements.

== Tourer in British English ==
In British English, Tourer is used for open cars.

The belt lines of 1930s tourers were often lowered at the front doors to suggest a more sporting character (however, this only allowed for removable glass or Perspex/Plexiglas side screens; wind-up windows, introduced later, required a more horizontal belt line on the doors).

Just as in the U.S., all-weather tourers are cars with high quality tops and glass side windows; they were later called convertibles.

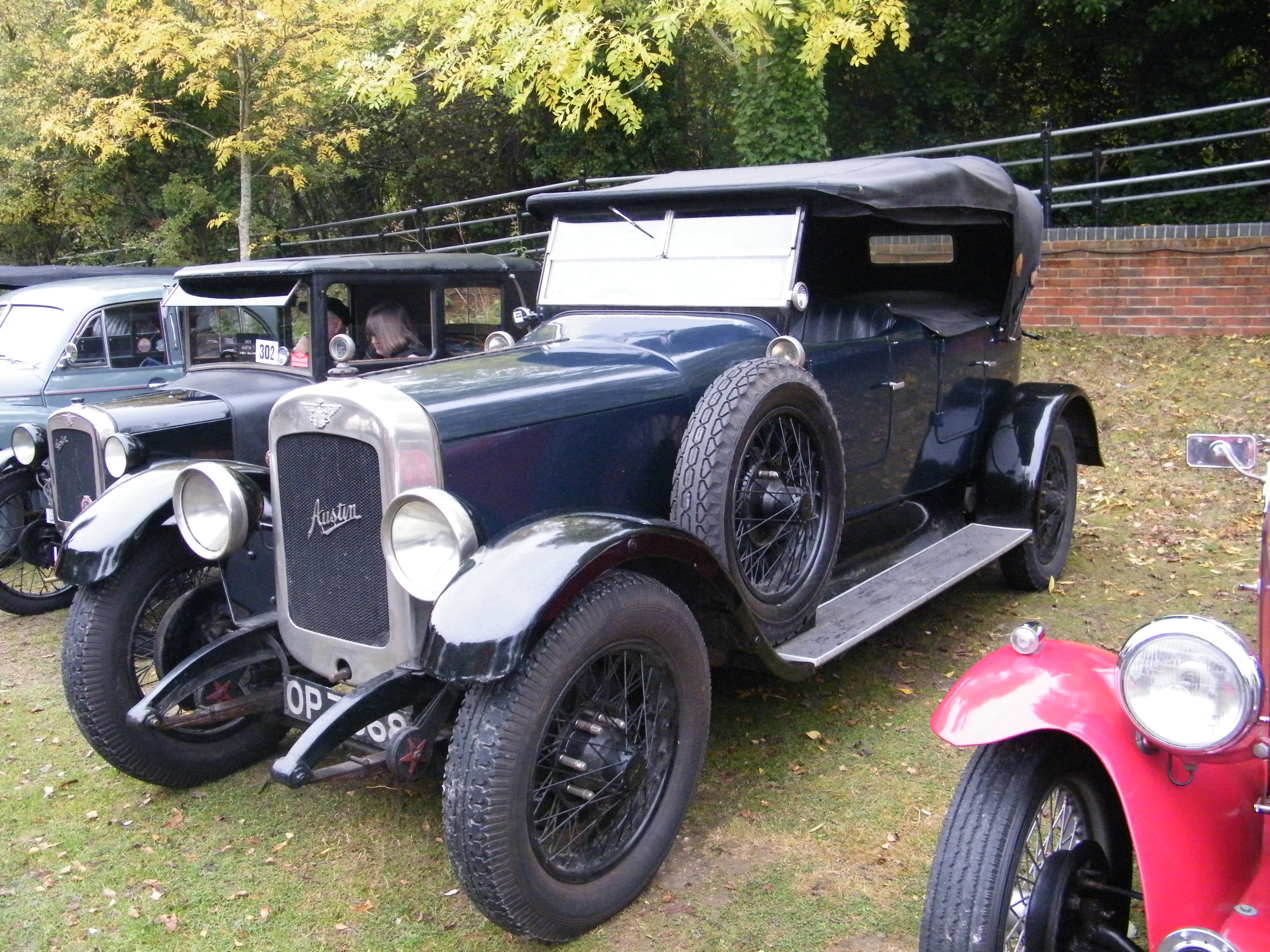
1927 Austin 20 tourer, front (without side curtains)

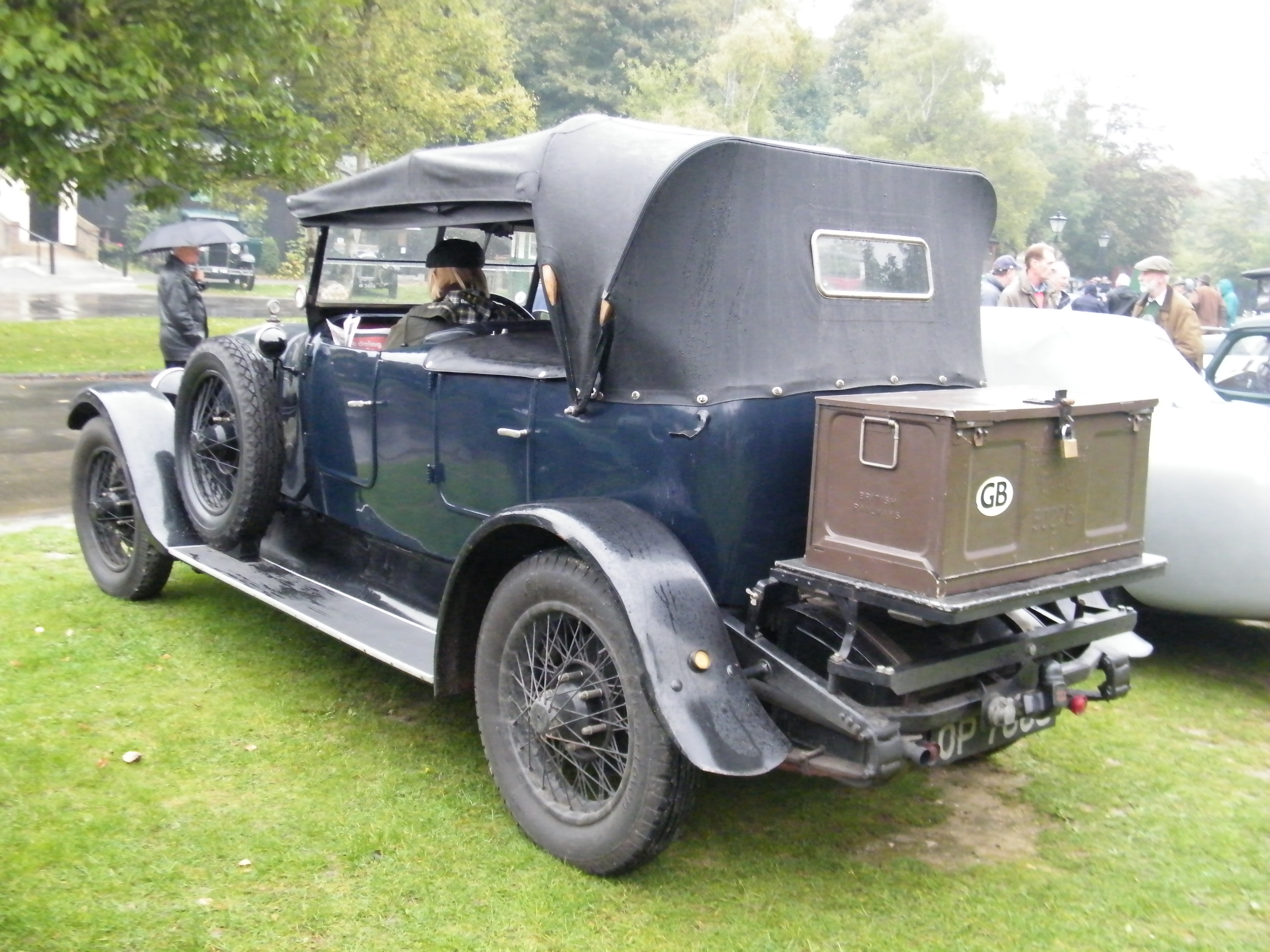
1927 Austin 20 tourer, rear

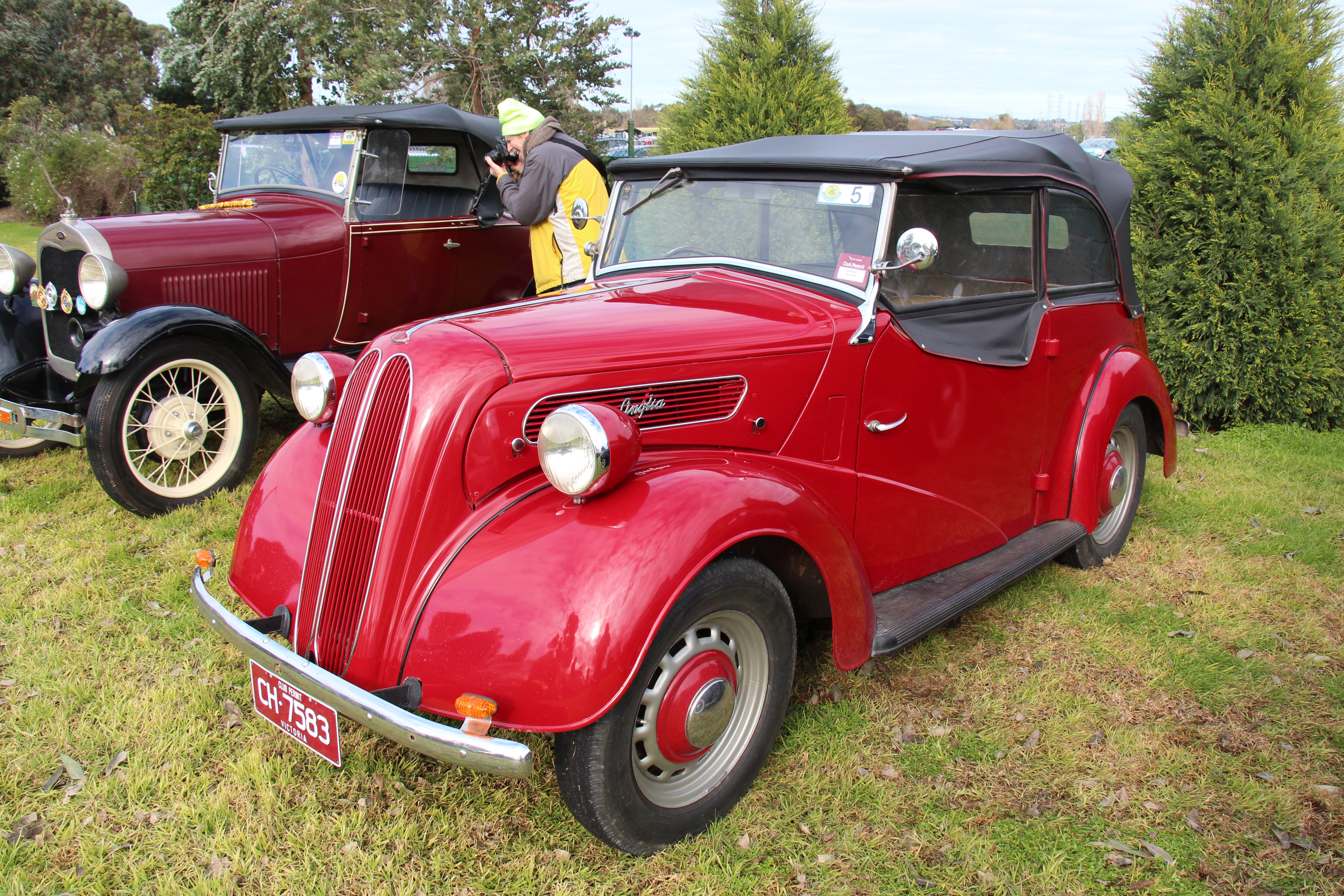
1951 Ford Anglia tourer: note the lowered beltline at the front door

=== Torpedo body ===
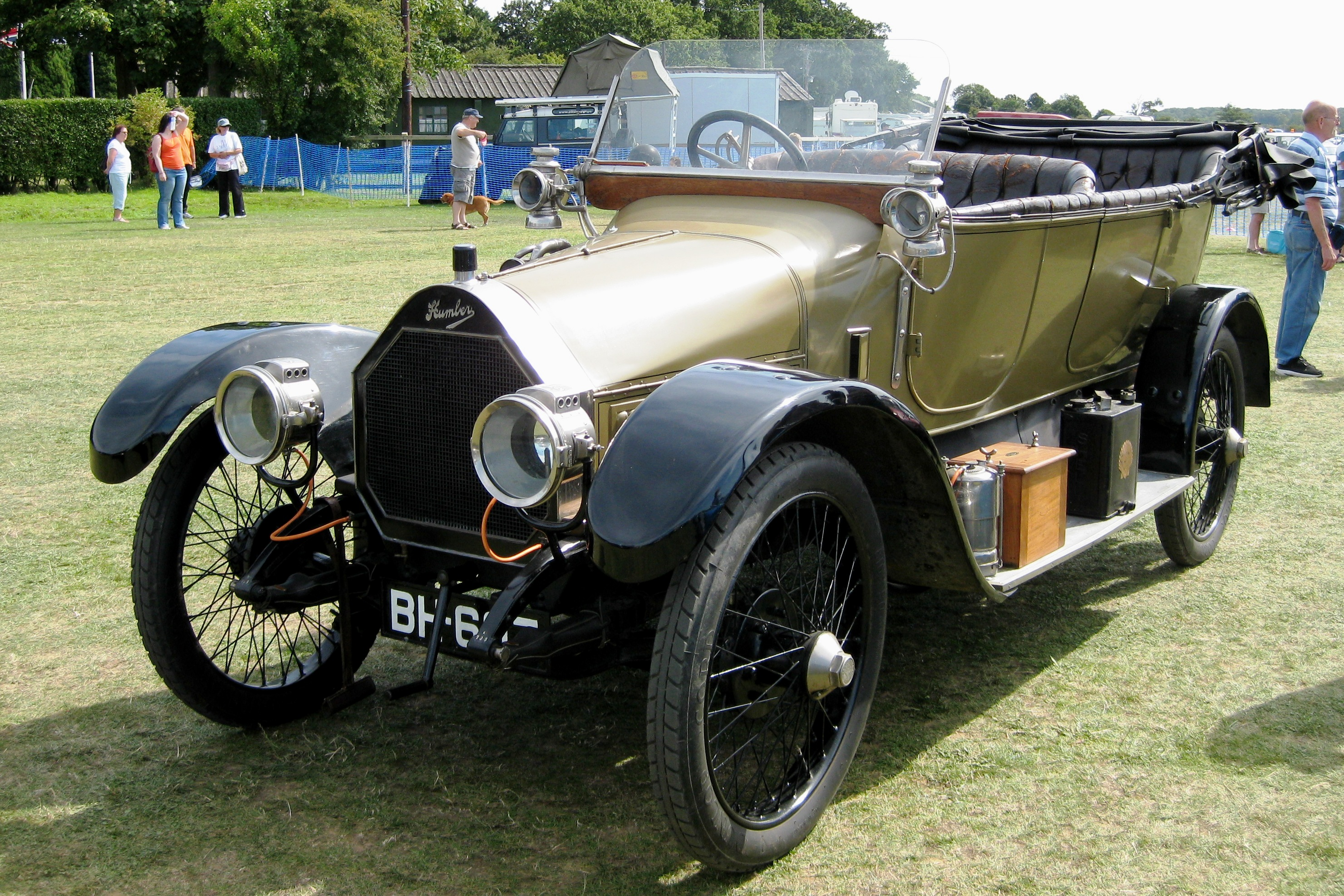
1914 Humber 11 torpedo- note the straight line from the radiator to the rear of the car

The torpedo was a style of 4-seat or 5-seat tourers built from 1908 until the mid-1930s. The design consists of a hood/bonnet line raised to be level with the car's waistline, resulting in a straight beltline from front to back.

== See also ==
- Barchetta – an Italian style of roadster or spyder developed for racing cars after World War II
- Phaeton body – similar to a touring car, but initially lighter and more sporting
- Runabout – a light, open two-seat car, similar to a roadster but with emphasis on economy instead of performance.
