= Studebaker Special Six =

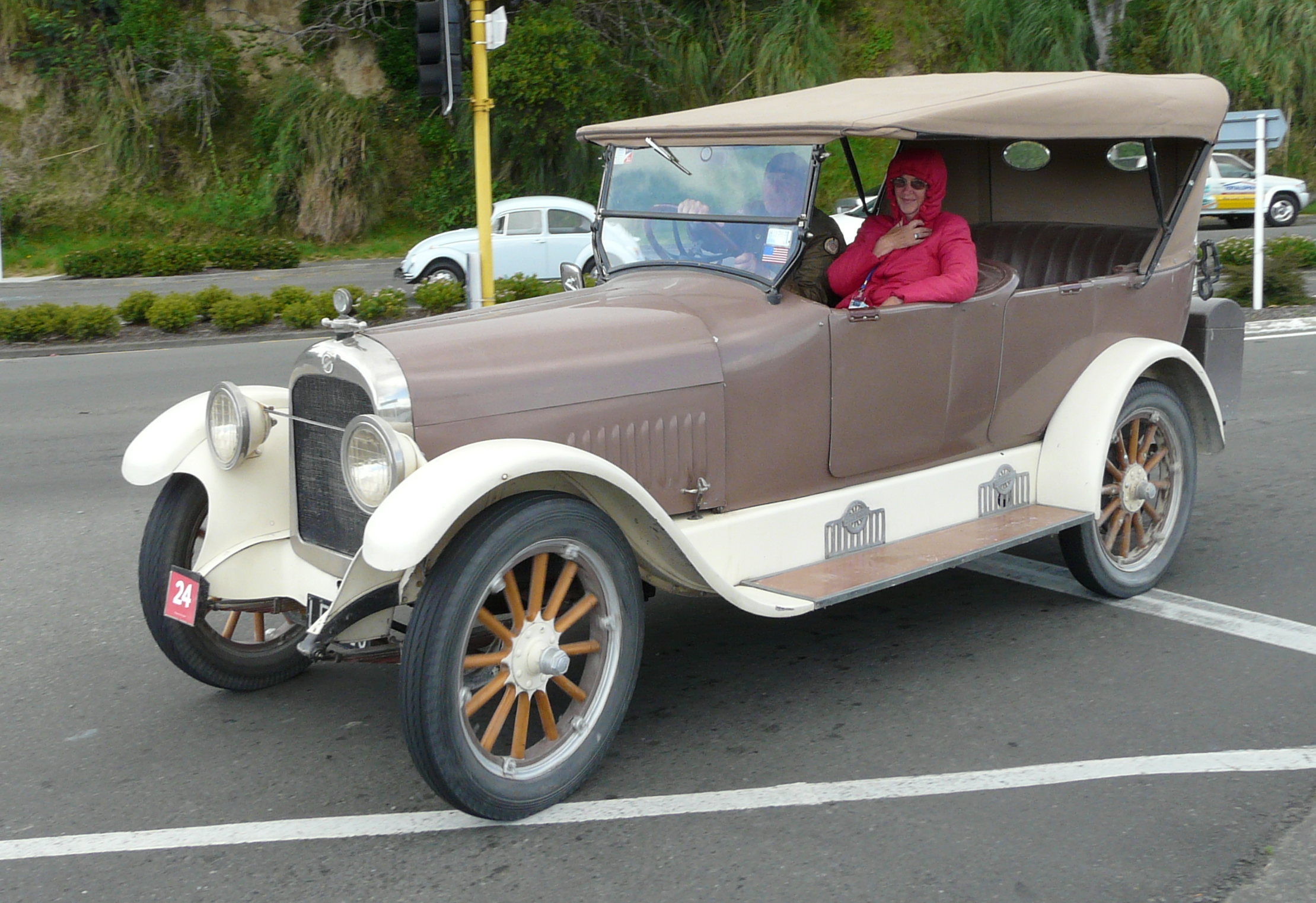
- 1918 Studebaker Special Six

Overview
- Manufacturer: Studebaker
- Model years: 1918–1927
- Assembly: Studebaker Automotive Plant, South Bend, Indiana, United States; Studebaker Automotive Plant, Detroit, Michigan, United States

Body and chassis
- Class: full-size
- Layout: Front-engine, rear-wheel-drive

Chronology
- Successor: Studebaker Commander

The Studebaker Special Six was an American automobile built by the Studebaker Corporation of South Bend, Indiana from 1918 to 1927.

While in production, the Special Six represented Studebaker's mid-range model. The car was available in a full array of body styles throughout its production.

== Studebaker Special Six Commander ==
In 1927 the car was renamed the Studebaker Special Six Commander in preparation for the 1928 model year when the car would be henceforth known as the Studebaker Commander.

== Standard Special Six Brougham specifications (1926 data) ==
- Color - Studebaker blue with black upper structure
- Seating Capacity – Five
- Wheelbase - 120 in (3,000 mm)
- Wheels - Wood
- Tires - 32” x 6.20” balloon
- Service Brakes - contracting on rear
- Emergency Brakes - contract on drum on rear of transmission
- Engine - Six-cylinder, vertical, cast en bloc, 3-1/2 x 5 inches; head removable; valves in side; H.P. 29.4 N.A.C.C. rating
- Lubrication - Force-feed
- Crankshaft - Four bearing
- Radiator – Tubular
- Cooling – Water Pump
- Ignition – Storage Battery
- Starting System – Two Unit
- Voltage – Six to eight
- Wiring System – Single
- Gasoline System – Vacuum
- Clutch – Dry plate, single disc
- Transmission – Selective sliding
- Gear Changes – 3 forward, 1 reverse
- Drive – Spiral bevel
- Rear Springs – Semi-elliptic
- Rear Axle – Semi-floating
- Steering Gear – Worm-and-wheel

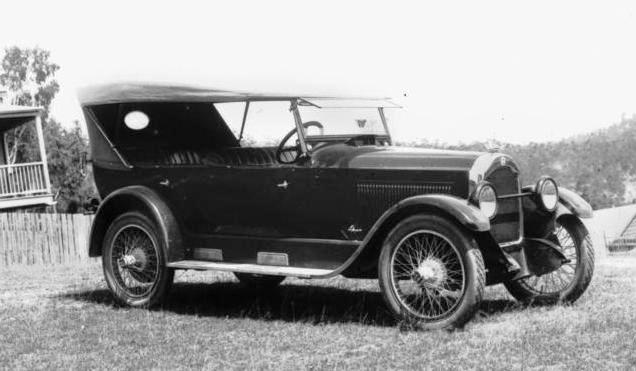
1924 Special Six

=== Standard equipment ===
New car price included the following items:

- tools
- jack
- speedometer
- ammeter
- electric horn
- thief-proof lock
- automatic windshield cleaner
- demountable rims
- stop light
- inspection lamp and cord
- spare tire carrier
- rear-view mirror
- sun visor
- cowl ventilator
- opalescent rear-quarter reading lamps
- motometer
- headlight dimmer
- clock

=== Optional equipment ===
The following was available in new models at an extra cost:

- Hydraulic four-wheel brakes with disc wheels
- Spare wheel

Source: Slauson, H. W.; Howard Greene (1926). ""Leading American Motor Cars"". Everyman's Guide to Motor Efficiency. New York: Leslie-Judge Company.
