= Studebaker Lark =

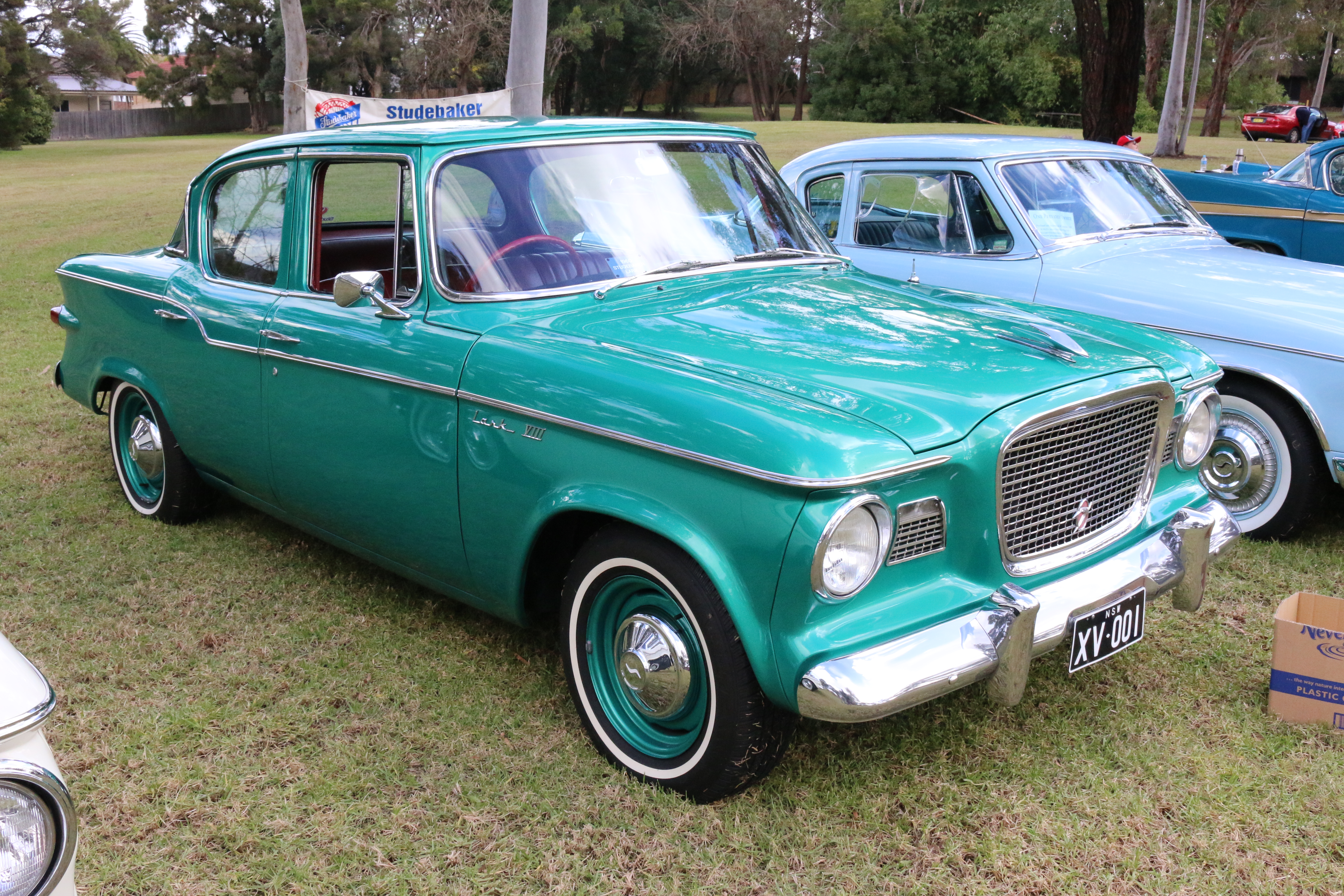
- 1960 Studebaker Lark 4-Door Sedan (Australia)

Overview
- Manufacturer: Studebaker
- Also called: Studebaker Cruiser (1963–1966); Studebaker Standard (1963 only); Studebaker Commander (1964 2nd series - 1966); Studebaker Daytona (1964 2nd series - 1966); Studebaker Wagonaire (1963–1966)
- Production: 1959–1966
- Assembly: Studebaker Automotive Plant, South Bend, Indiana, United States; Studebaker Canada, Hamilton, Ontario, Canada; Studebaker Australia, Melbourne, Victoria, Australia Motor Industries International, Otahuhu, Auckland, New Zealand

Body and chassis
- Body style: 2/4-door sedan 2-door coupe 2-door convertible 2/4-door station wagon
- Layout: FR layout
- Related: Studebaker Wagonaire; Studebaker Champ

Chronology
- Predecessor: Studebaker Scotsman

The Studebaker Lark is a compact car that was produced by Studebaker from 1959 to 1966.

From its introduction in early 1959 until 1962, the Lark was a product of the Studebaker-Packard Corporation. In mid-1962, the company dropped "Packard" from its name and reverted to its pre-1954 name, the Studebaker Corporation. In addition to being built in Studebaker's South Bend, Indiana, home plant, the Lark and its descendants were also built in Hamilton, Ontario, Canada, from 1959 to 1966 by Studebaker of Canada Limited. The cars were also exported to a number of countries around the world as completed units and completely knocked down (CKD) kits which were then assembled at a local factory.

Lark-based variants represented the bulk of the range produced by Studebaker after 1958 and sold in far greater volume than the contemporary Hawk and Avanti models. Beginning with the 1963 Cruiser, the Lark name was gradually phased out of the company catalog and by early 1964, Lark-based models were being marketed under Commander, Daytona and Cruiser nameplates only. The Studebaker company, which celebrated its 100th anniversary in 1952, ceased automobile production in 1966.

== Development ==
At the time the Lark was conceived, Studebaker-Packard Corporation was under a management contract with Curtiss-Wright Aircraft Company. Studebaker-Packard had been losing money for a few years when company president Harold E. Churchill came up with the idea of abandoning the full-size car market in favor of building a new compact car that he hoped would save the company.

The Lark was designed around the core bodyshell of the full-sized 1953–1958 Studebakers. By reducing the front and rear overhangs and shortening the wheelbase ahead of the firewall, the design retained seating for six people and substantial luggage space. The new model was introduced in the fall of 1958 as a 1959 model in an effort to improve Studebaker’s financial position. Harold E. Churchill drew inspiration from the earlier Studebaker Champion and the lower-priced Studebaker Scotsman.

Two series of Larks were available, the Lark VI and the Lark VIII, both designations indicated whether the engines were of six or eight cylinders. Both series were available in "Deluxe" and "Regal" trim levels.

With its simple grille (similar to that found on the 1956-1959 Hawk), minimal and tasteful use of chrome and clean lines, the Lark "flew" in the face of most of the established "longer, lower and wider" styling norms fostered by Detroit's "Big Three" automakers (General Motors, Ford, and Chrysler). Studebaker's 1957-58 Scotsman had proved the existence of a demand for a less-flashy automobile, and while the Lark was not nearly so undecorated as the Scotsman, it was unmistakably purer of line than anything Detroit would offer for 1959, save the Rambler American.

== First generation (1959–1961) ==
First generation
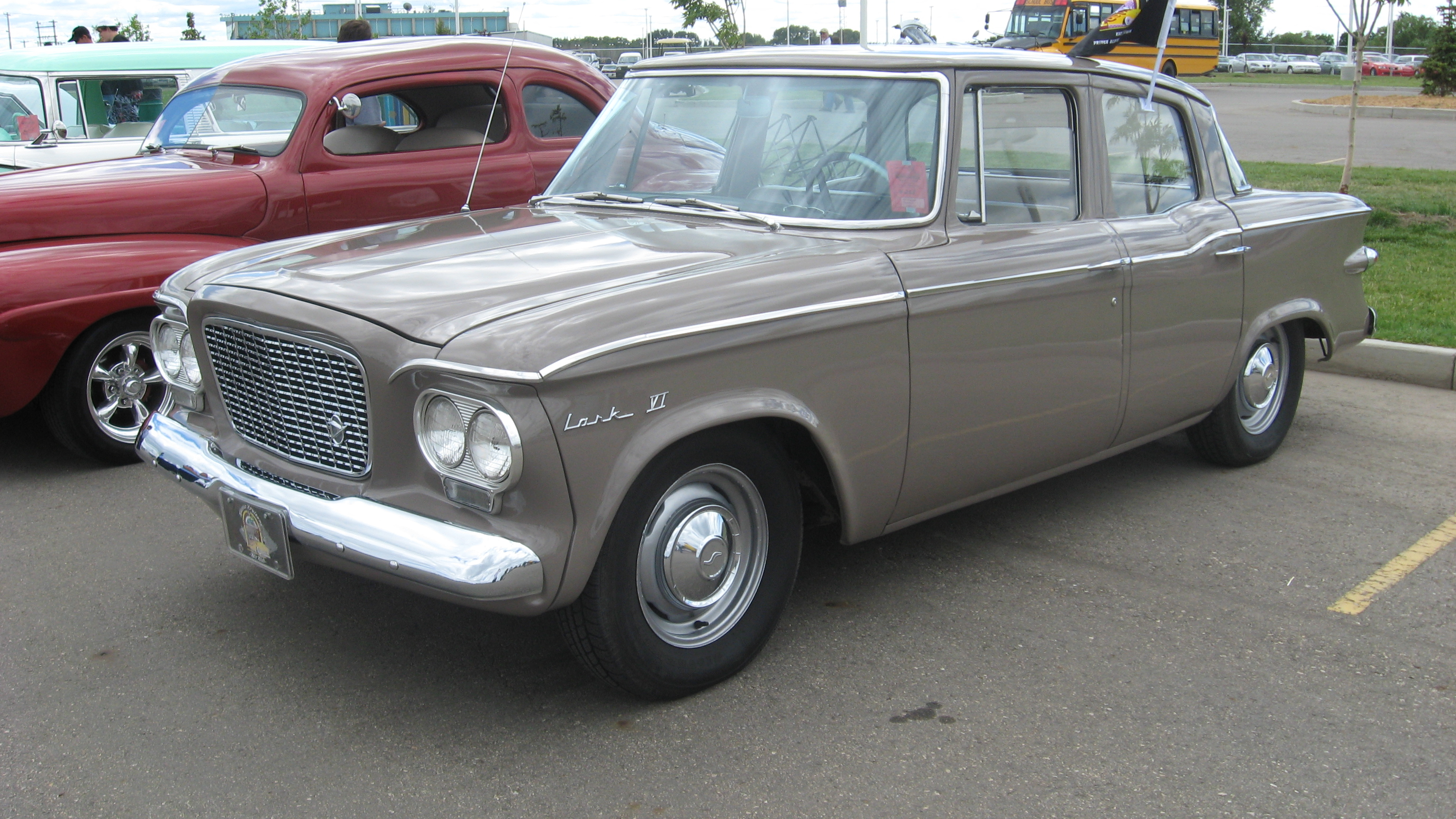
- 1961 Studebaker Lark VI 4-door Sedan

Overview
- Production: 1959–1961
- Assembly: South Bend, Indiana; Hamilton, Ontario, Canada; Kaiser Frazer of Israel, Haifa, Israel; Australia

Powertrain
- Engine: 170 cu in (2.8 L) Champion sv I6; 170 cu in (2.8 L) Skybolt OHV I6; 259 cu in (4.2 L) OHV V8; 289 cu in (4.7 L) OHV V8

Dimensions
- Wheelbase: 108.5 in (2,756 mm); Wagon/Cruiser: 113 in (2,870 mm)

Sales of the Lark were good for the 1959 and 1960 model year, thanks to the fact that Studebaker had obtained "dual" dealerships with dealers of the Big Three manufacturers that did not as yet have their own compacts to sell.

Initial models included two- and four-door sedans, a two-door hardtop coupe and a two-door station wagon, with two levels of trim (Deluxe and Regal) offered on most. Aside from American Motors Corporation's Rambler line, the Lark offered the broadest line of compacts on the U.S. market. Indeed, the Lark was the first car of its size to offer a V8 engine — the slightly smaller Rambler American offered only an inline six, though the slightly larger Rambler Rebel did offer a V8 close to the same size as Studebaker's, and had since 1957.

The lineup grew for 1960, when the company introduced a convertible (Studebaker's first since 1952) and a four-door station wagon. Two-door wagons were fast falling from favor throughout the industry, despite a minor redesign which made the two-door Lark wagon's tailgate and rear side windows more user-friendly, and indeed the four-door quickly proved the more popular of the two available wagons from Studebaker.

A taxicab version of the Lark, originally called the "Econ-O-Miler," was built on the station wagon's longer 113 in (2,900 mm) wheelbase. The extra 4.5 in (110 mm) of wheelbase translated into extra rear seat legroom, which was important in the taxi trade.

For 1959 and 1960, Larks were available with either an L-head (flathead) 170 cu in (2.8 L) six-cylinder engine or the company's 259 cu in (4.2 L) V8. Testers at the time gave high marks to the V8's performance. A V8 Lark could turn out a 0 to 60 mph time of around 10 seconds, which was on par with much larger cars. By comparison, among the early Big Three compacts (Ford Falcon, Mercury Comet, Chevrolet Corvair and Plymouth Valiant) that arrived on the scene in 1960, only the Valiant could break the 20-second mark from 0-60 mph. None of the Big Three compacts offered a V8 until the second wave of such cars — the so-called "senior compacts" — arrived for 1961.

To meet the challenge of those new cars head-on, for 1961 Studebaker created a new four-door sedan, the Cruiser, using the Econ-O-Miler taxicab body with an upgraded, more luxurious interior. The resulting car harked back to the long-wheelbase Studebaker Land Cruiser sedans of the late Forties and early Fifties. These cars can be distinguished from their lesser four-door counterparts by the 1959-60-style roofline and operational vent windows in the rear doors, while other sedans used one-piece glass in the rear doors.

A new option, a canvas-covered folding sunroof dubbed the "Skytop" was introduced as an extra-cost feature for sedans and the two-door hardtop. A mild restyling, too, was carried out. Non-Cruiser sedans and the two-door hardtop received a squared-off roofline, and a new front end design gave the Lark a broader grille and the availability of quad headlamps (as standard equipment on Regal and Cruiser models, optional on Deluxes).

Although the styling was modified, engineering enhancements were the big news for 1961, as the Larks received a performance boost. Studebaker advertised as "the compact with Performability," and this was abetted by the addition of the 289 cu in (4.7 L) V8 from the Hawk family sports car as an option, although this was mainly for Larks intended for police pursuit packages. The bigger news, as far as the general public was concerned, involved the six-cylinder engine. Studebaker's engineers had long known that their little flathead mill, which dated in its basic form to 1939, was falling farther and farther behind the competition in both power and fuel economy. Lacking the budget to design a completely new engine, the engineering staff converted the 170 engine to overhead valves while retaining much of the basic design. The "new" six, which displaced the same 170 cu. in. as before, went from 90 hp (67 kW) to 112 hp (84 kW), all without a loss in fuel economy. Indeed, most road testers of the day found the new engine to be easier on fuel than the flathead, and cars so equipped were able to shave nearly four seconds off the all-important 0-60 mph time. The redesigned six, known as the "Skybolt Six," was marketed by Studebaker extensively in 1961.

Other engineering improvements that modernized the 1961 Larks included the introduction of cowl ventilation, suspended brake and clutch pedals (accompanied by a firewall-mounted brake master cylinder) and revamped steering systems.

Unfortunately, for all of its new engineering and the mild restyling, sales of the Lark dropped off precipitously for 1961. Even more new competitors were squeezing their way into the marketplace, as Dodge brought out the Lancer, and General Motors issued the Buick Special, Oldsmobile F-85 and Pontiac Tempest. These new "senior compacts," in addition to their very presence in the market, caused other problems for Studebaker. Most of the Big Three dealers who had signed on with the independent when the Lark debuted dropped the smaller company under pressure from the Detroit manufacturers once the new cars broke cover. Those who did not drop Studebaker outright often put more effort to selling their other product lines.

The Italian Studebaker importer commissioned two-door and four-door redesigns from Francis Lombardi and Pietro Frua respectively. These were first shown in November 1960, at the Turin Auto Show. Both designs came in for criticism regarding the front of the cars, but were otherwise well regarded. Intended for small-scale production for the Italian market, it is unknown if any were built aside from the display examples.

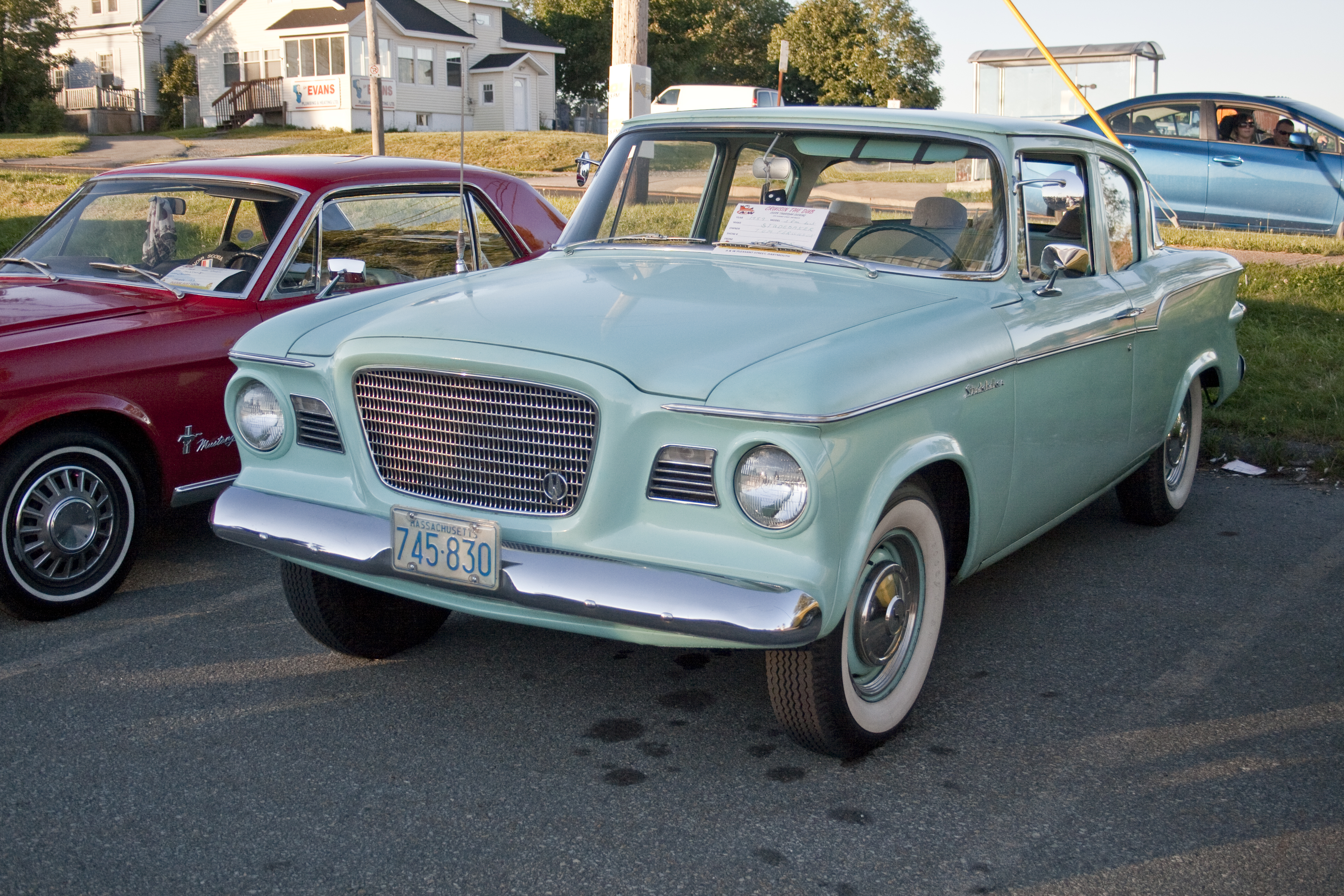
1959 Studebaker Lark 2-Door Sedan

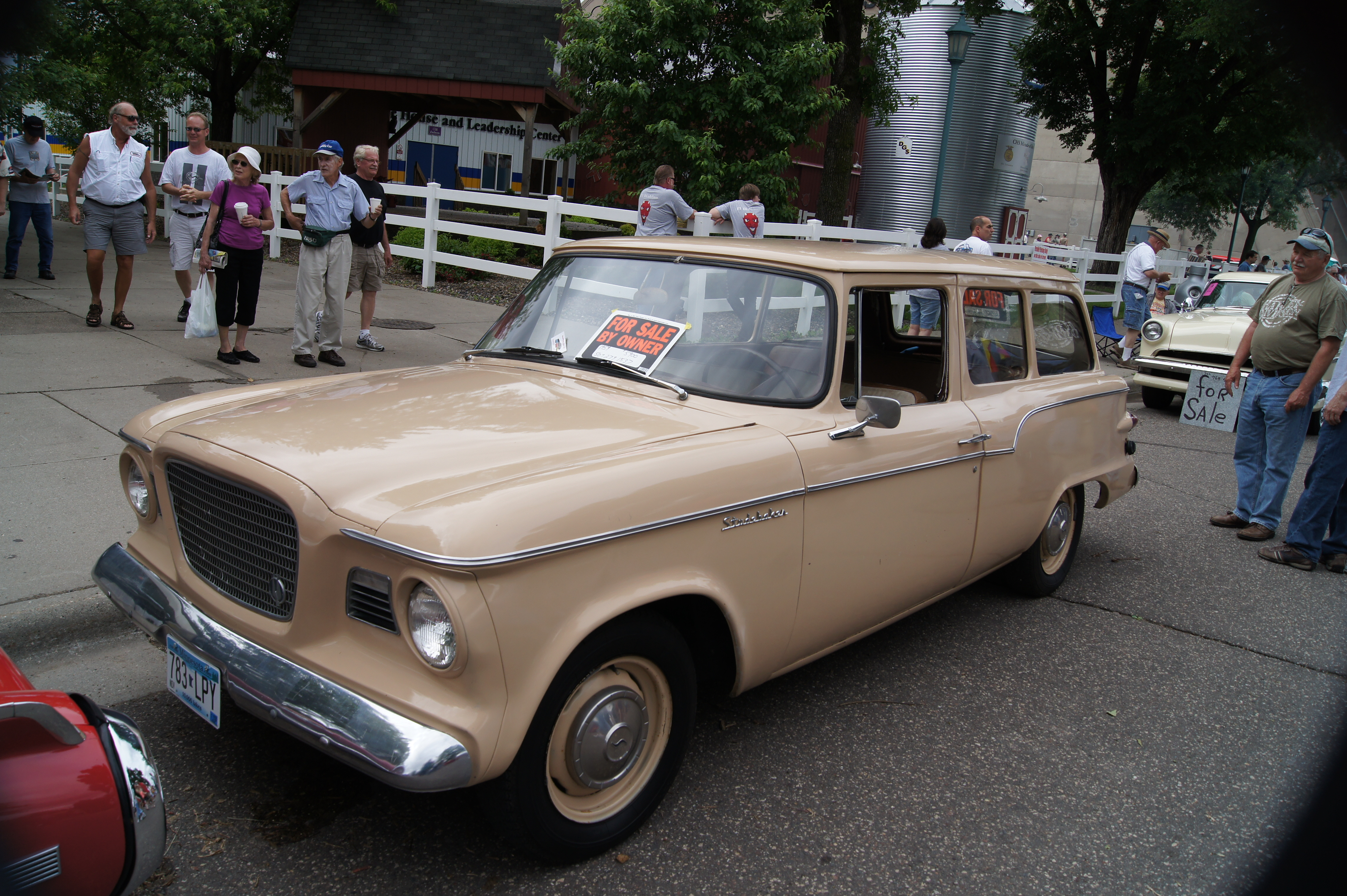
1959 Studebaker Lark 2-Door Wagon

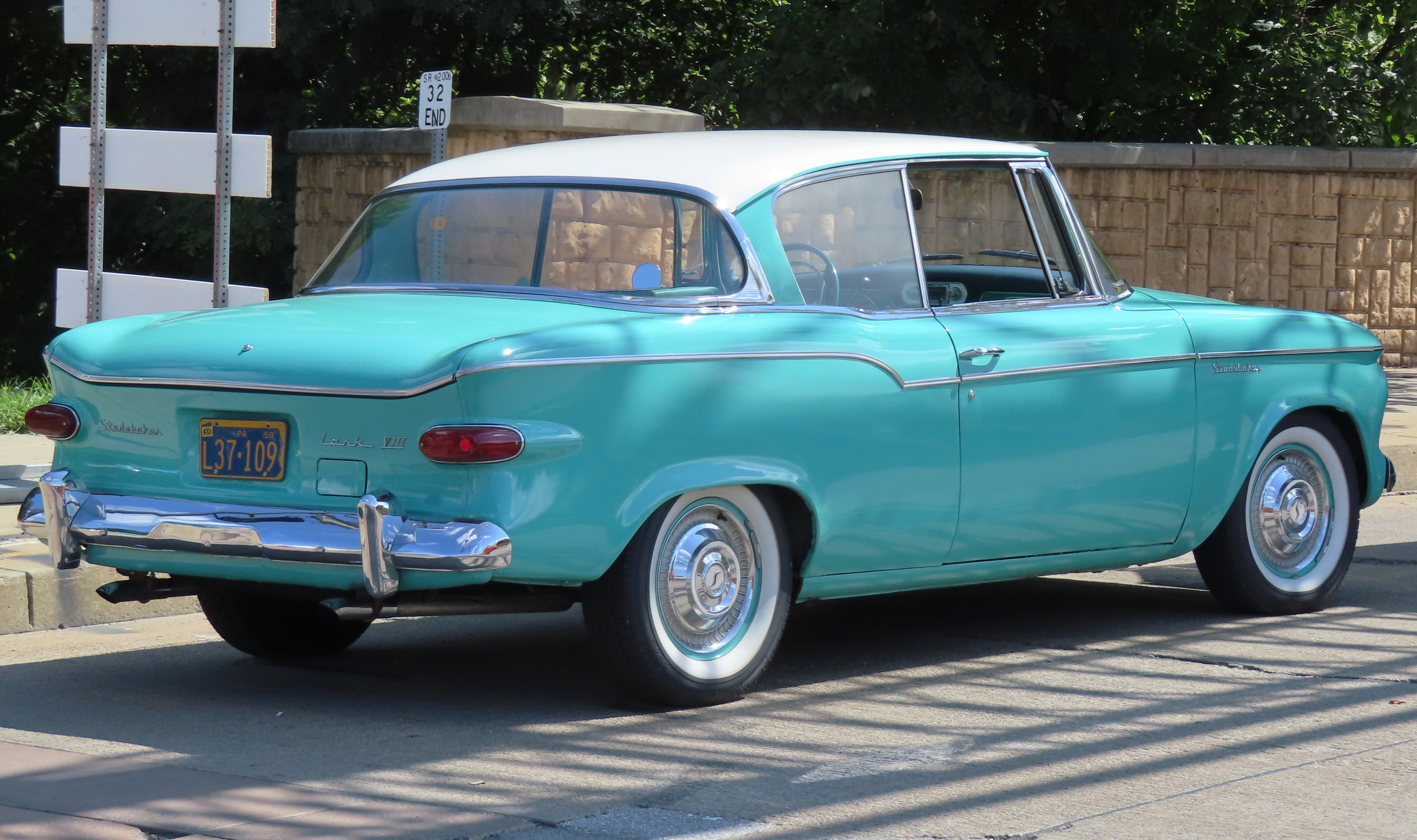
1959 Studebaker Lark VIII hardtop, rear view

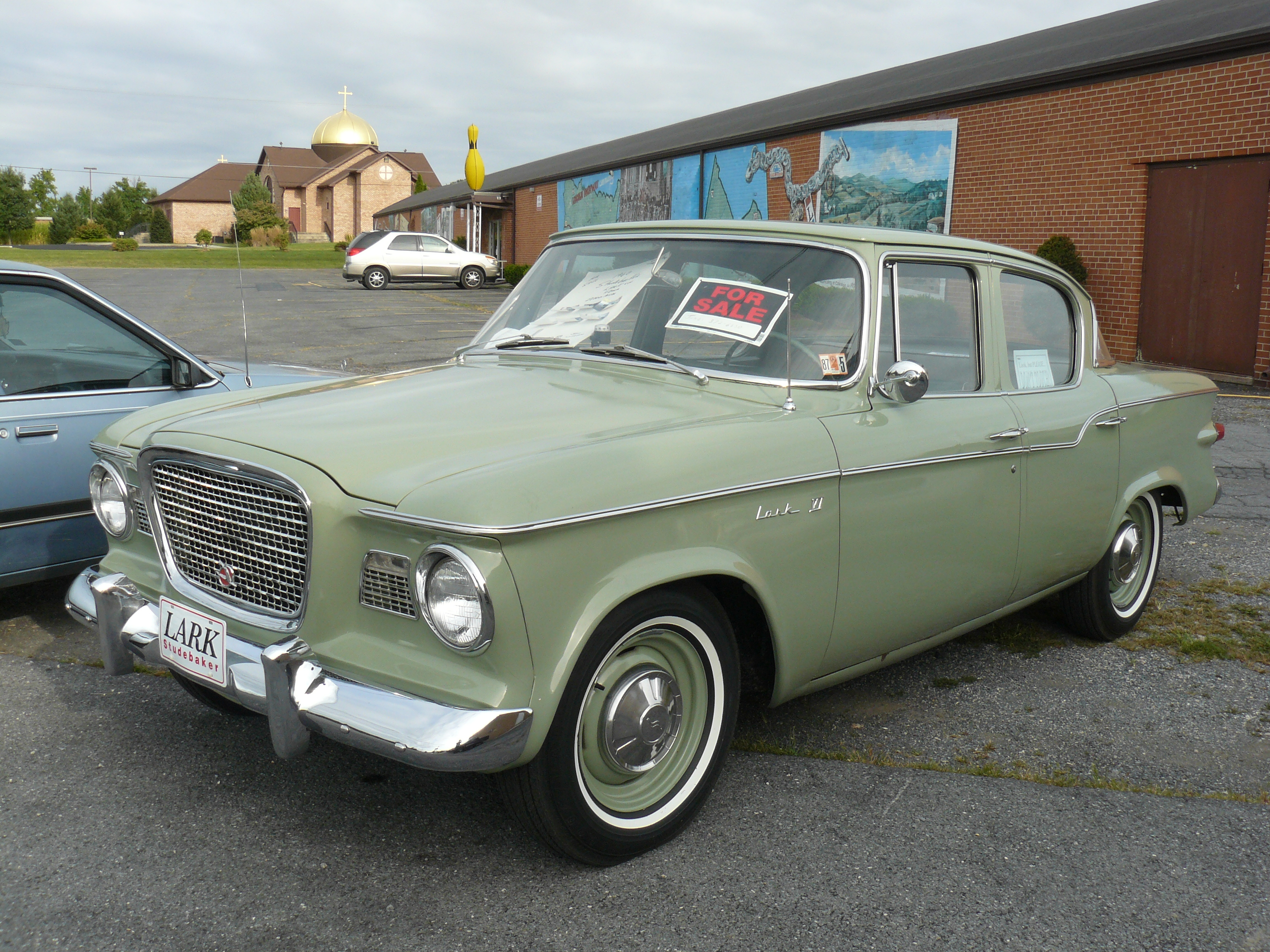
1960 Studebaker Lark VI 4-Door Sedan

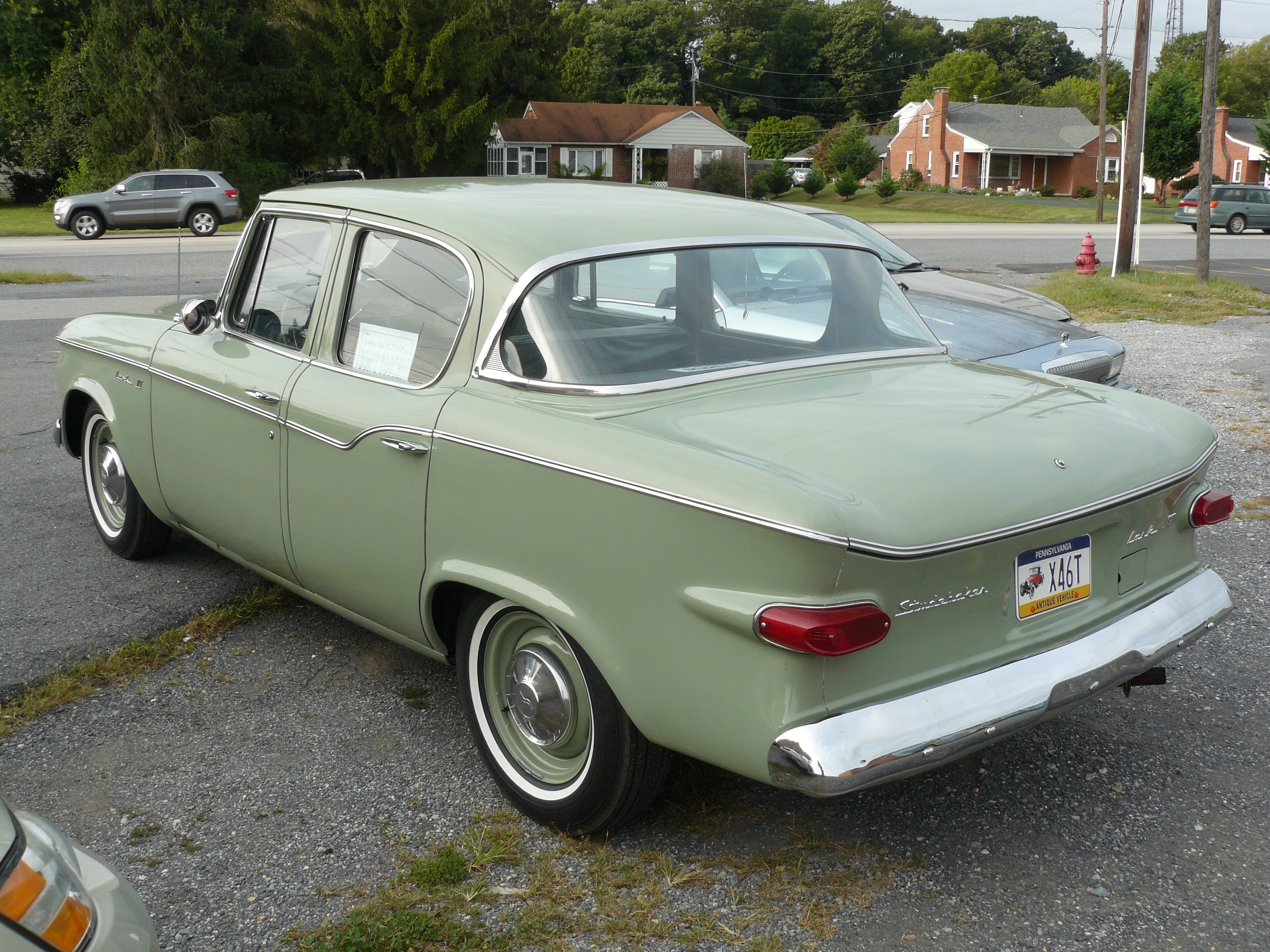
1960 Studebaker Lark VI 4-Door Sedan

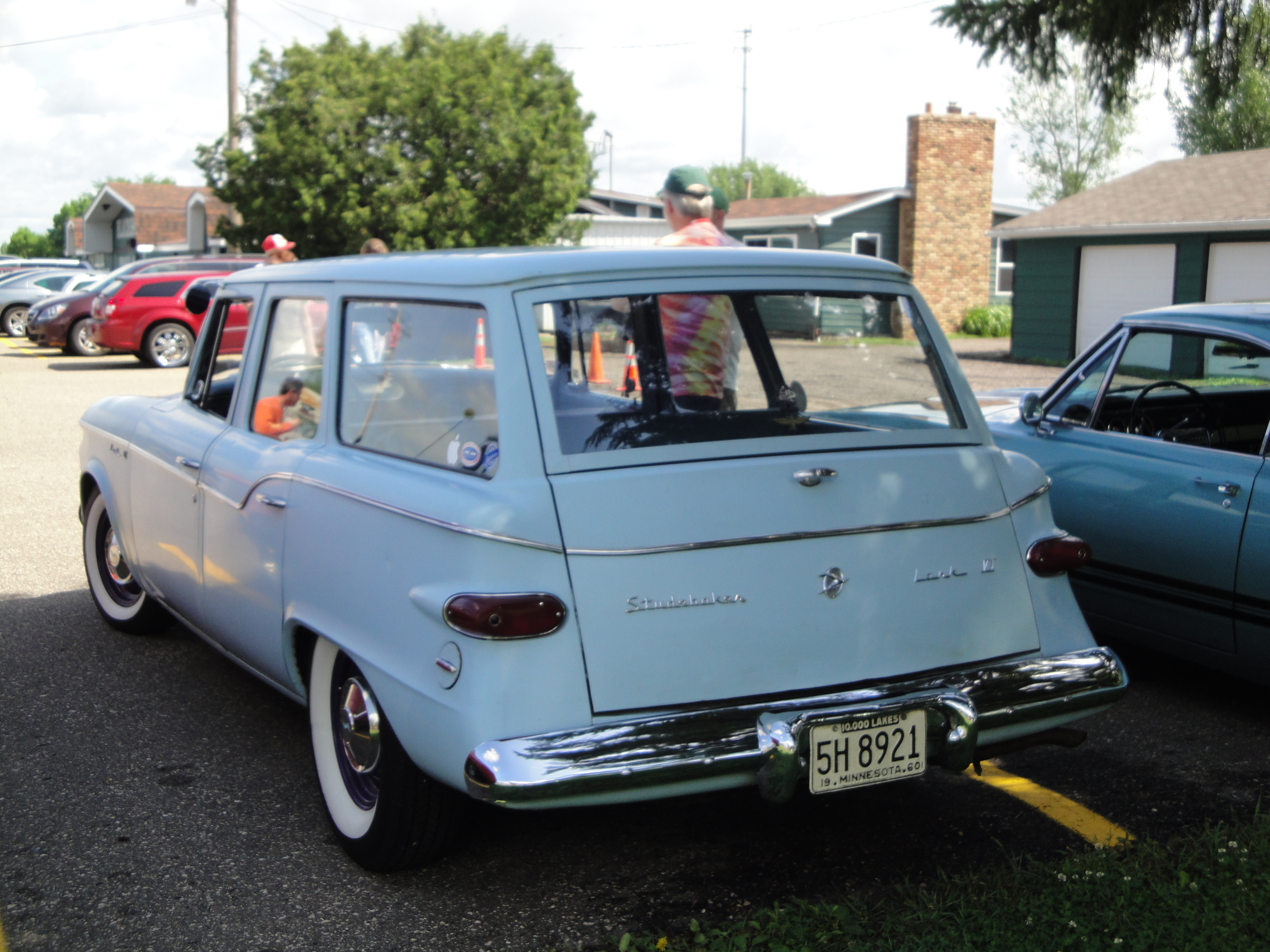
1960 Studebaker Lark VI four-door station wagon

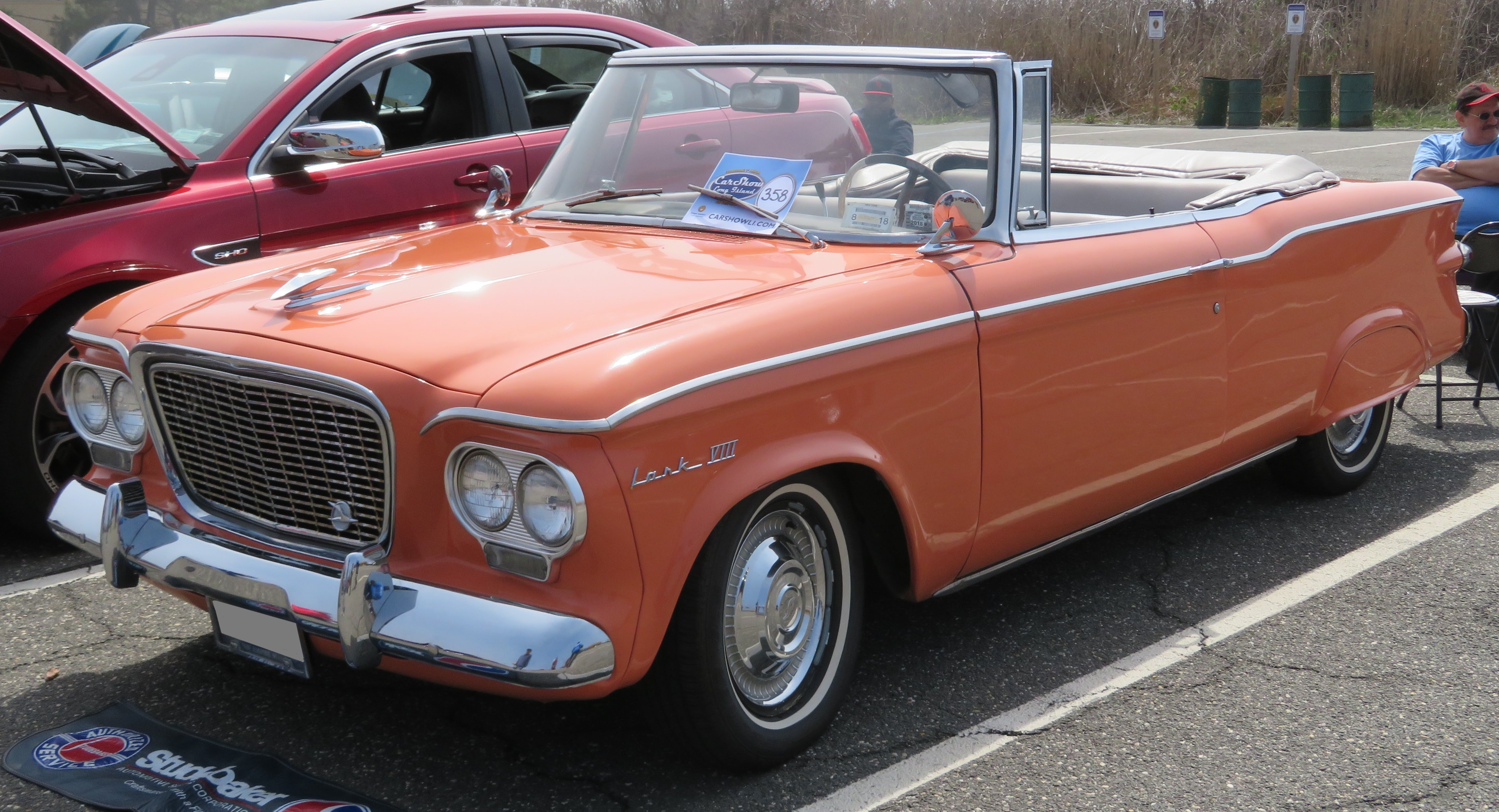
1961 Studebaker Lark VIII Convertible

== Second generation (1962–1963) ==
Second generation
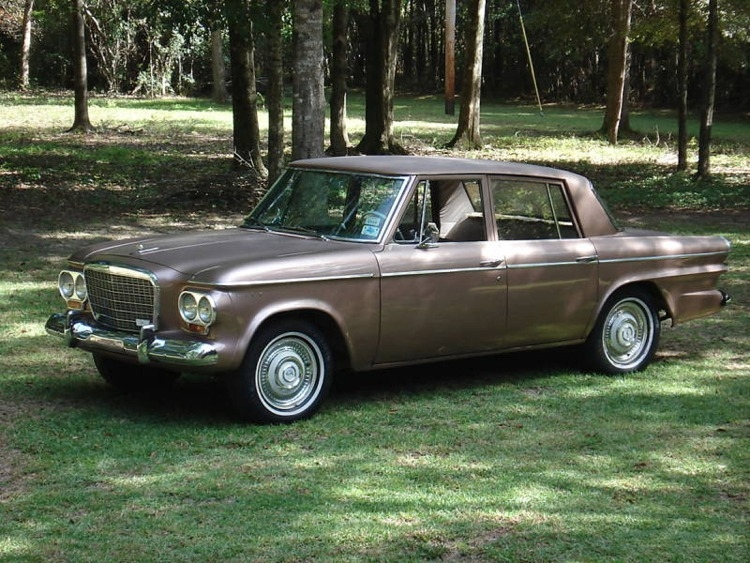
- 1963 Studebaker Lark Regal 4-Door Sedan

Overview
- Production: 1962–1963
- Assembly: South Bend, Indiana; Hamilton, Ontario, Canada; Kaiser Ilin Industries, Haifa, Israel; Australia Otahuhu, Auckland, New Zealand (batches in 1963 and 1965)

Powertrain
- Engine: 170 cu in (2.8 L) I6; 259 cu in (4.2 L) V8; 289 cu in (4.7 L) V8; 289 cu in (4.7 L) R2 s/c V8

Dimensions
- Wheelbase: 113 in (2,900 mm)
- Length: 184 in (4,700 mm)

=== 1962 ===
In an effort to reverse the downward sales trend created when Detroit rolled out its own compacts in 1960 and 1961, new Studebaker-Packard president Sherwood Egbert called upon his friend, noted industrial designer Brooks Stevens, to effect a striking yet cost-effective 1962 update. Stevens lengthened the car body, especially at the rear, and modernized the interior. Studebaker's board of directors were reportedly pleased with the extent of the changes Stevens was able to make. They could not believe he could do so much for so little money.

In addition to the new styling, Studebaker joined the increasing popularity of front bucket seats and center console models of the early 1960s with the introduction of the Daytona. In the same way that the Cruiser had become the top-of-the-line four-door for 1961, the new Daytona replaced the Regal as the top-trim convertible and hardtop, although Regal versions of these body styles remained available.

All four-door sedans for 1962 moved to the Cruiser's 113 in (2,900 mm) wheelbase body. However, the Cruiser remained the only four-door with rear-door vent windows. Two-door models gained a half-inch in wheelbase, up from 108.5" to 109".

The only model that was deleted from the 1962 lineup was the Deluxe series two-door wagon, which had slipped in popularity since the four-door wagon's debut in 1960. However, some leftover 1961-model two-door wagon bodies were fitted with the new 1962 front clips. This was done to fill a U.S. government fleet order. No one is certain how many were built, although the number was certainly minuscule, and none are known to exist today.

The immediate effect of Stevens' restyle was improved sales. Indeed, had it not been for a strike called by the United Auto Workers Local 5 in early 1962 at Studebaker's South Bend home plant, writers then and now expressed confidence that the company could have easily sold more than 100,000 of the new cars. Despite the strike, which halted production for 38 days, the company sold over 90,000, far more than had been sold in 1961.

=== 1963 ===
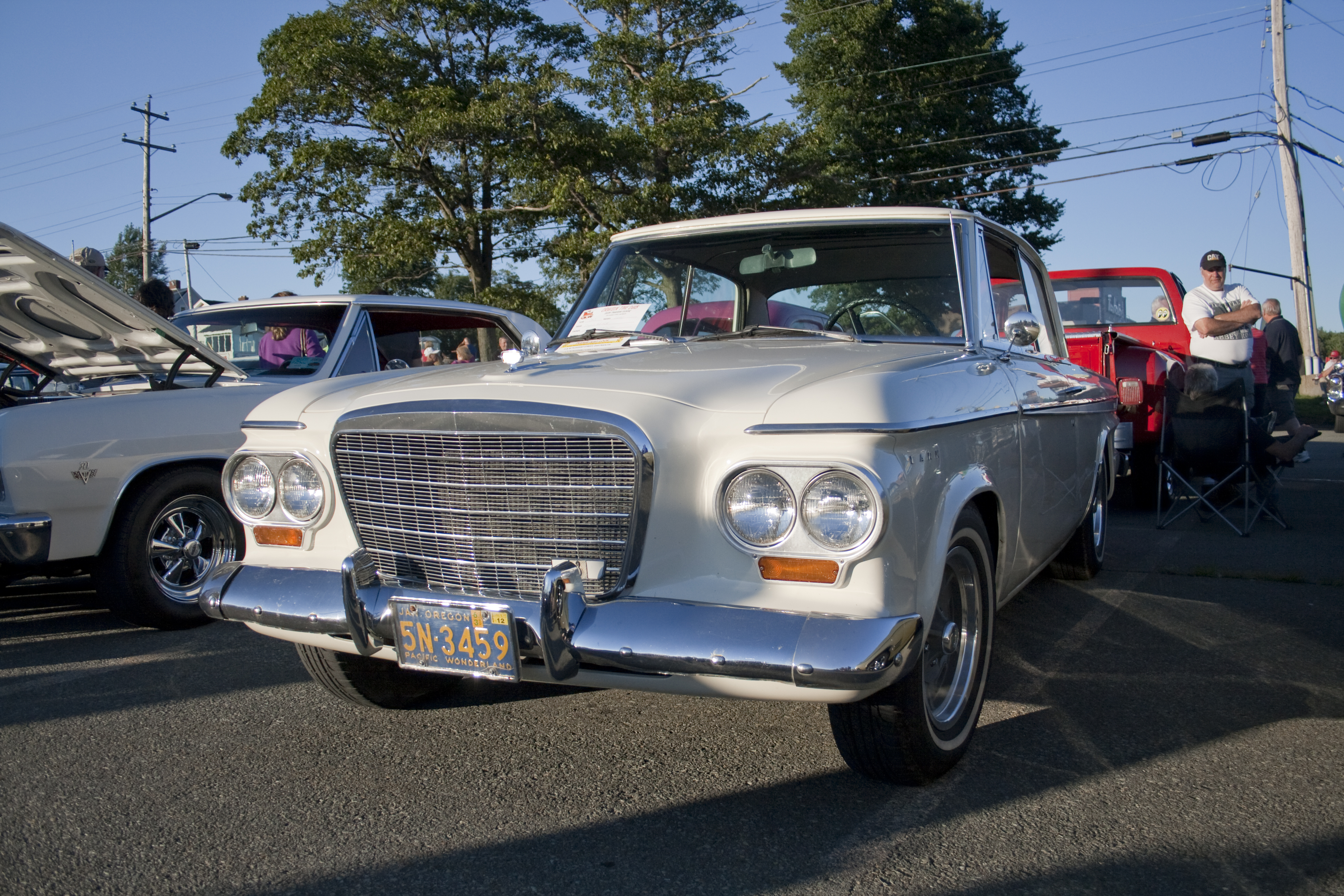
1963 Studebaker Lark Daytona hardtop

For 1963, Stevens again restyled the Lark. The dated wrap-around windshield was eliminated and the entire "greenhouse" was lightened via the use of thinner door and roof pillars. Doing away with the thick framing that had been a much-criticized feature of Studebaker's bodies since 1953 imparted a much more modern appearance.

Inside the cars, a completely new instrument panel with full instrumentation (sans idiot lights) was installed, although the designers were not able to integrate the available air conditioning into the panel; the evaporator and vents were still hung beneath the dash in a space-robbing box. For the ladies, an "Exclusive Beauty Vanity" with a mirror and makeup tray was fitted in the glove box compartment on most models. Just in case anyone would forget that Studebaker's glove box contained the vanity feature, the fronts were adorned with the word "Vanity" in golden script.

Aside from the Avanti, the biggest product news for Studebaker in 1963 was the introduction of the novel sliding-roof Wagonaire. Designed by Stevens, the Wagonaire was perhaps the greatest advance in station wagons since the late-1940s introduction of the all-steel body. Dealers found that while buyers were curious in the sliding roof of the Wagonaire, many were hesitant to consider them seriously. When combined with reports of water leakage that many of the early models experienced, management deemed that a less exotic fixed roof wagon was needed. These were added at mid year.

Elsewhere in the lineup, the Cruiser was given heavy promotion as a sensibly sized luxury car. The brochures referred to it as "America's First and Only Limousette." To separate it from the Lark, Studebaker eliminated the "Lark" lettering from the front fenders and added fancier side trim. Inside, buyers could choose luxurious broadcloth upholstery, lending credence to Studebaker's luxury push for the Cruiser.

The Daytona line was expanded for 1963, adding the new Wagonaire to the continuing convertible and hardtop. A new Custom trim level, which used side trim similar to that used on the 1962 Daytonas, stepped into the Regal's former place. Daytonas received new side trim that started as a narrow molding on the front fenders and widened toward the rear. The basic design of this trim was shared with the Cruiser.

With the elimination of the Deluxe Lark, this left the formerly "hi-line" Regal models demoted to Studebaker's base model when the 1963 cars were introduced. Regals were simple badged as "Lark" and received a thin stainless steel trim piece that extended from the tip of the front fender to the end of the rear fender. While the interiors were plain, they were far from spartan. The Regal line shared the newly introduced padded dash, with vanity, with its higher priced sister models, and the vinyl interior for some exterior colors featured three colors and textures of vinyl, but with less tufting. Buyers could also option a Regal with any of the engine and transmission choices found in the higher priced models.

In mid-1963, Studebaker introduced the Standard series, a totally stripped line of Larks in the vein of the 1957-58 Scotsman, bumping the Regal up a notch in the model hierarchy. While it — like the Cruiser at the other end of the line — was obviously a Lark, it bore no Lark nameplates, just "Studebaker" scripts (first used on 1956 Hawks) on the front fenders. In addition, the Standard, in keeping with its frugal image, carried no side trim, and had a plainer interior with no vanity, just a simple glove box with a lid that opened at the top. Mainly promoted as a fleet vehicle, the Standard offered good value; the two-door sedan carried a base price of only US$1,935. This price was very competitive with other companies' small- and mid-sized cars.

On the engineering front, disc brakes made by Bendix (first offered on the Avanti) were made available; at $97.95, they were a good value and greatly improved the cars' stopping power. In the engine lineup, in addition to the existing six-cylinder and V8 engines of the past, new options were added for the 1963 model year. Naturally aspirated "R1" and supercharged "R2" 289 V8s from the Avanti were made available. Buyers choosing those engines late in the model year could also order a "Super Performance Package", which added a host of high-performance options aimed at making the cars not only go faster, but handle better. Cars equipped with the package were called "Super Larks".

Though the 1963 models were seen as an extension of the improvements made the previous year, the buying public by this time was looking for more than just a mild change, and sales fell, this time to around 77,000 cars.

Gallery

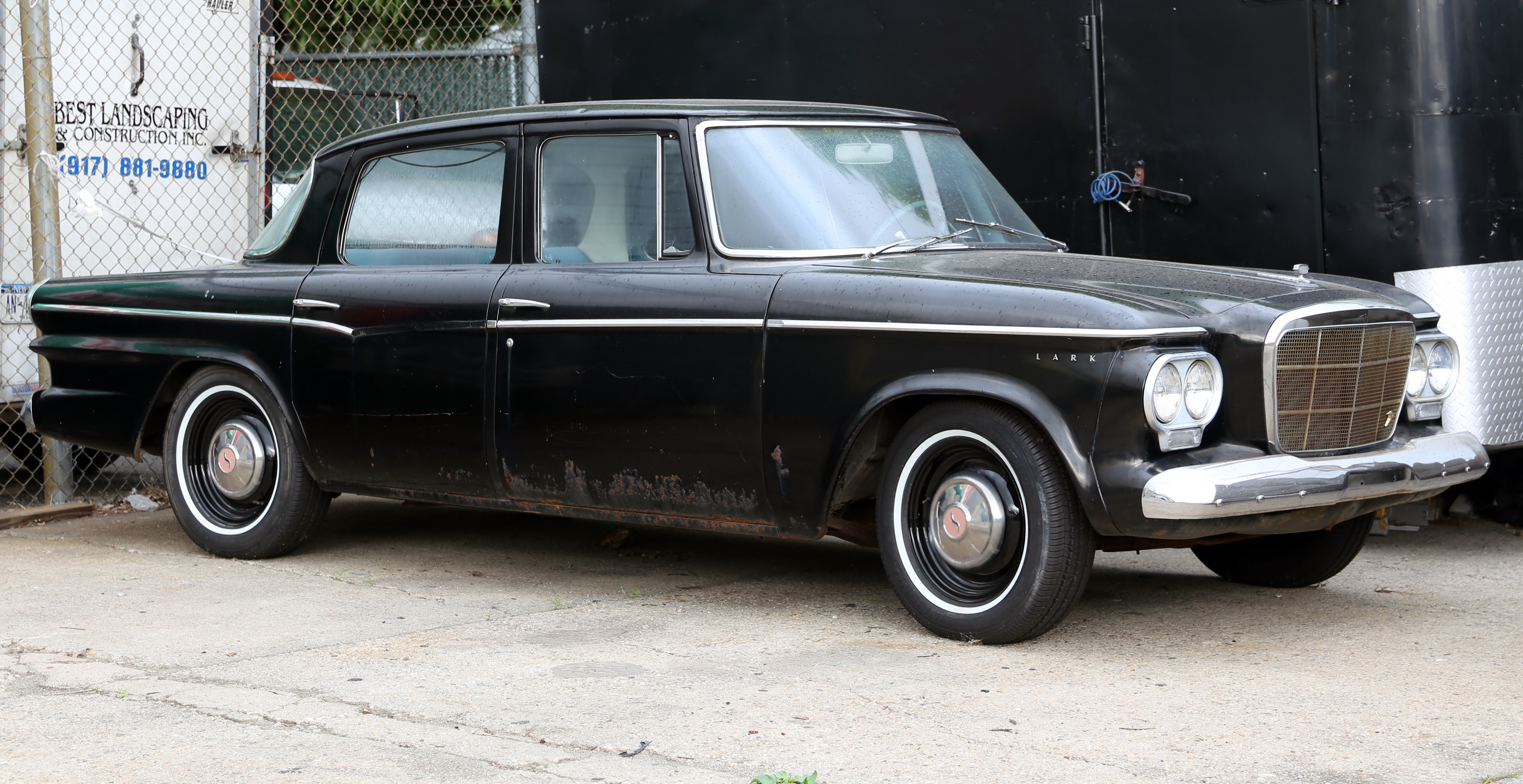
1962 Lark four-door sedan

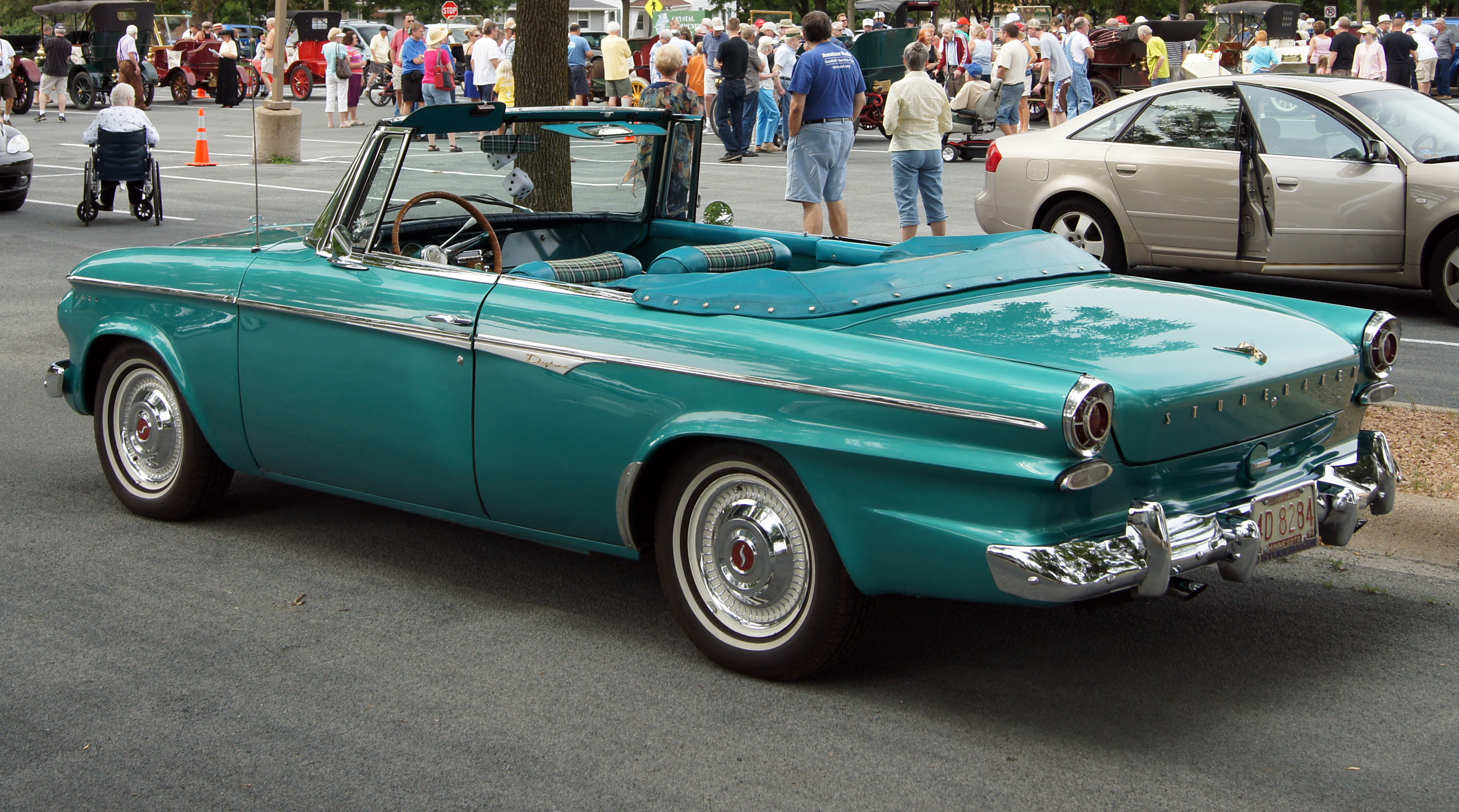
1962 Lark Daytona convertible, rear view

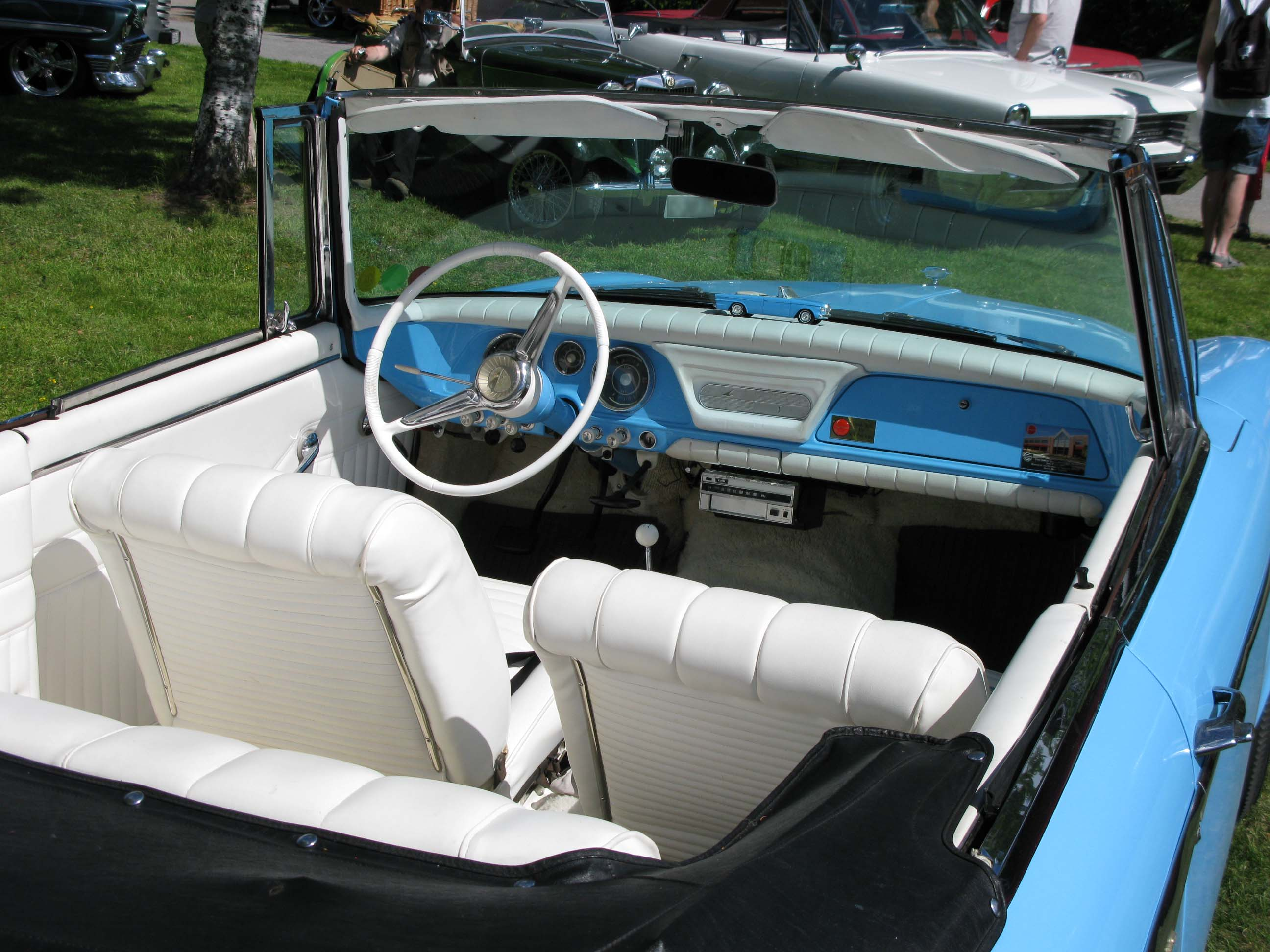
Dashboard of 1962 Lark Daytona

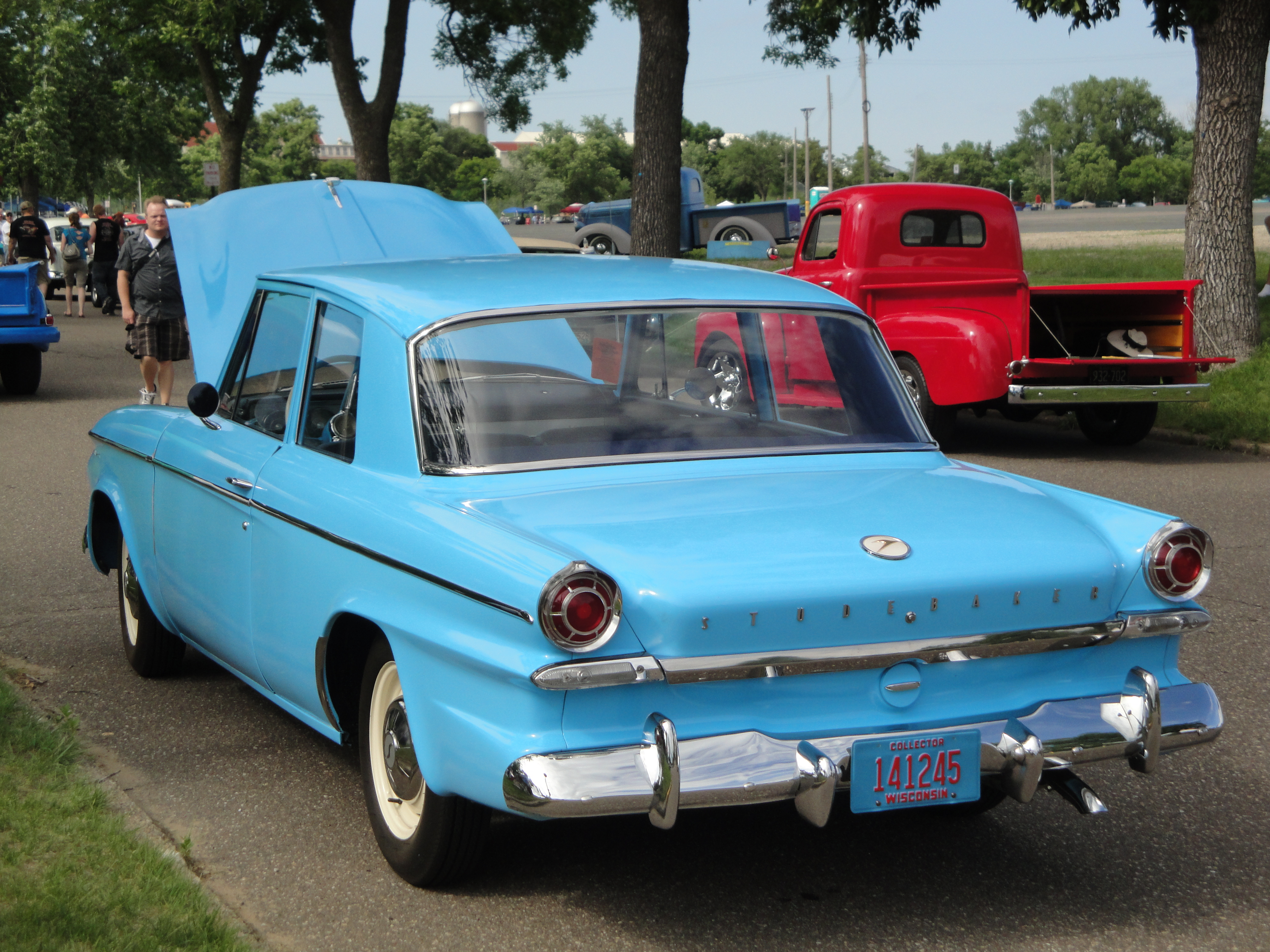
1963 Lark two-door sedan (rear)

== Third generation (1964–1966) ==
Third generation
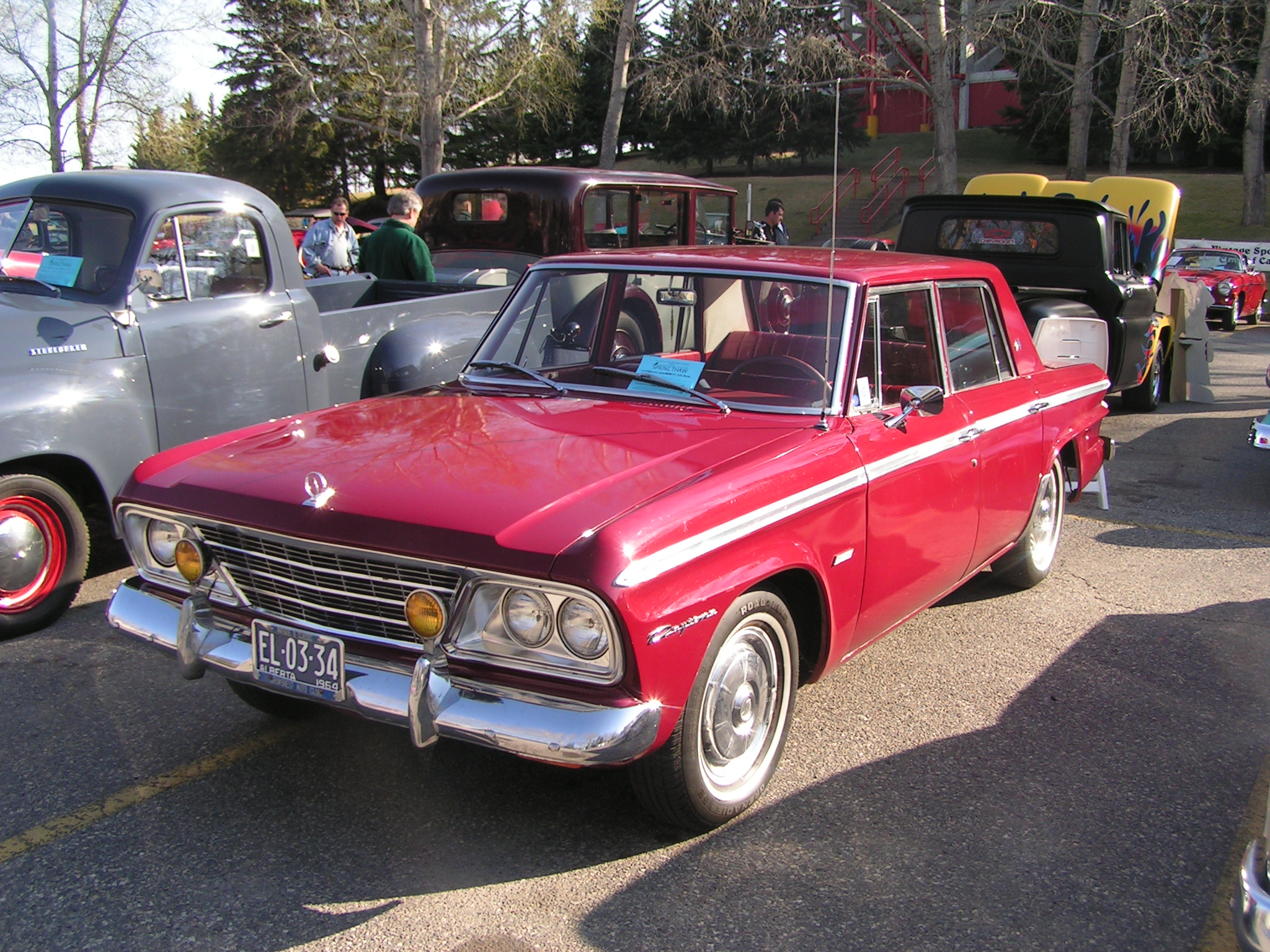
- 1964 Studebaker Daytona 4-door sedan

Overview
- Production: 1964–1966
- Assembly: South Bend, Indiana (through December 1963 only); Hamilton, Ontario, Canada; A.Ilin Industries, Haifa, Israel; Australia

Body and chassis
- Related: Studebaker Wagonaire

Powertrain
- Engine: 170 cu in (2.8 L) Skybolt I6; 194 cu in (3.2 L) Chevrolet I6; 230 cu in (3.8 L) Chevrolet I6; 259 cu in (4.2 L) V8; 283 cu in (4.6 L) GM small-block V8; 289 cu in (4.7 L) V8

Studebaker's executives allowed Stevens to continue the process of modernizing main line vehicles that resulted in a more extensive (but still inexpensive) restyling for 1964. What resulted was the most mainstream looking Studebakers since 1946. The Hawk-like grille of 1962-63 gave way to a full-width, stamped aluminum grille and squared-off headlamp surrounds. Stevens flattened the hood, roofline and trunklid, and reworked the tail panel to incorporate new horizontal taillamps and backup lamps, all the while ingeniously retaining the sculpted quarter panels introduced in 1962, which still suited the new look and reduced by a considerable amount the cost of tooling.

The new look debuted along with the company's plan to phase out the Lark name entirely. The lowest-priced models were renamed Challenger (replacing the 1963-1/2 Standard), while the Commander name (which had last made an appearance in the Studebaker lineup on the last full-size cars in 1958) replaced the Regal trim level. The Daytona series added a four-door sedan (replacing the 1963 Custom four-door), and the Cruiser continued at the top of the line. All models except the Cruiser offered a Wagonaire.

Challenger and Commander models came standard with single headlamps, the first time since 1961 that a Lark-based vehicle offered them. Dual lamps were an extra-cost option.

For 1964, the Lark name was only used on early Challenger and Commander models. Early promotional materials referred to the Challenger and Commander as Larks, but aside from Lark emblems on the roof sail panels on Challengers, there was no Lark identification on the cars, as Studebaker replaced the Lark emblems elsewhere on the car with the company's "circle-S" logo.

Inside, the cars were only slightly modified, with minor changes made in upholstery, glovebox opening, and gauge position. The speedometer, which in 1963 had resided in the right-hand "hole" in the gauge cluster, was moved to the center position, with the optional clock or tachometer placed on the right. For 1966, McKinnon's Chevrolet-licensed 140 hp (104 kW) 230 cu in (3.8 L) inline-six engine became an option for automatics, and later for manuals as well.

The purpose-built Marshal model in three body styles was marketed to police departments. Brochures claimed that "130 mph is merely incidental". The Marshal was available in Pursuit, Patrol, and City variants.

=== Closure of South Bend facility, December 1963 ===
Studebaker worked very hard to establish a high-performance image for the 1964 lineup, sending a number of cars to the Bonneville Salt Flats to set new production-car speed records. Advertisements played up the powerful R-series engines, disc brakes and the company's position that Studebakers were "different ... by design" from other American cars.

Magazine road test reviews of the new cars were generally positive. One of the more-popular automotive magazines of the day even got to help build the car they would test. Gene Booth, the editor of Car Life magazine, went to South Bend and assisted in building a Daytona hardtop with the full R4 Super Performance Package. This car ended up being the only Studebaker equipped from the factory with the optional R4 engine (304 cu in (5.0 L), with two four-barrel {four-choke} carburetors).

Despite styling changes, innovative models like the Wagonaire, the high-performance R-series engines and Super Performance Packages (inspired by the Avanti) that were developed with the help of "Mr. Indy 500" Andy Granatelli (who headed Studebaker's Paxton Products and STP divisions), sales did not increase. By the early autumn of 1963, Studebaker's board of directors acted to slow down the South Bend assembly lines. At the start of the model year, the company was building 60 cars per hour. By late October 1963, some 2,500 workers were laid off and the line speed was reduced.

Rumors were spreading in the media that the board of directors and the company's president, Sherwood Egbert, were at odds over the future of the automotive division. The board's opinion was that it was finally time to find a way out of the auto business. Lending strength to the board's argument were the undeniable facts that Studebaker's subsidiary companies were profitable, while the growing losses at the automotive division were bleeding the corporation dry.

Despite being terminally ill with cancer, Egbert fought the directors tooth and nail in his efforts to continue auto operations. However, when he had to undergo further cancer surgery (his third since 1962) that month, the board took the opportunity to force Egbert out and execute their plan to wind up automotive production.

Although it would by necessity have to be done slowly and methodically, lest the company expose itself to contract lawsuits from angry dealers (which would have drained even more precious revenue from the company's depleted coffers), the directors quickly put their plan into action. Meeting with the leaders of UAW Local 5, which represented Studebaker's assembly workers, the decision was made to close the South Bend plant and continue production at the company's small Canadian factory in Hamilton, Ontario, which could, it was believed, be operated at a profit.

The closure of the South Bend plant was announced on December 9, 1963, and the final Lark-type car, a Bordeaux Red 1964 Daytona two-door hardtop (originally intended for shipment to a dealer in Pennsylvania), rolled off the assembly line on December 20. This car is now housed at the Studebaker Museum in South Bend.

=== 1964 ===
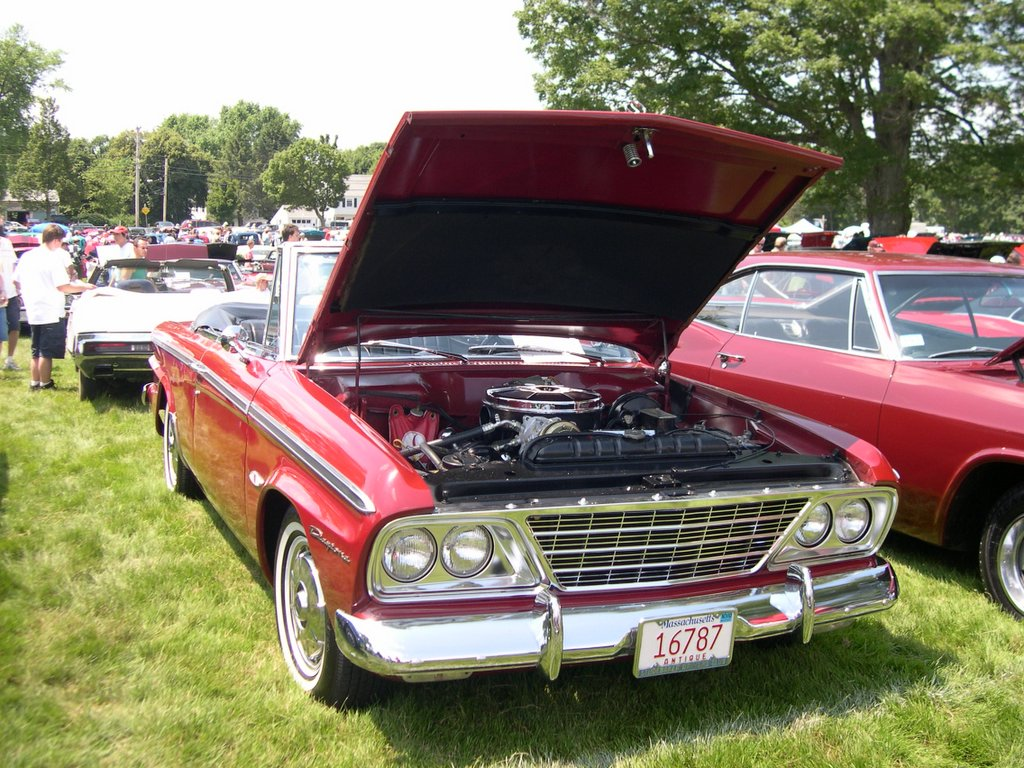
1964 Studebaker Daytona convertible

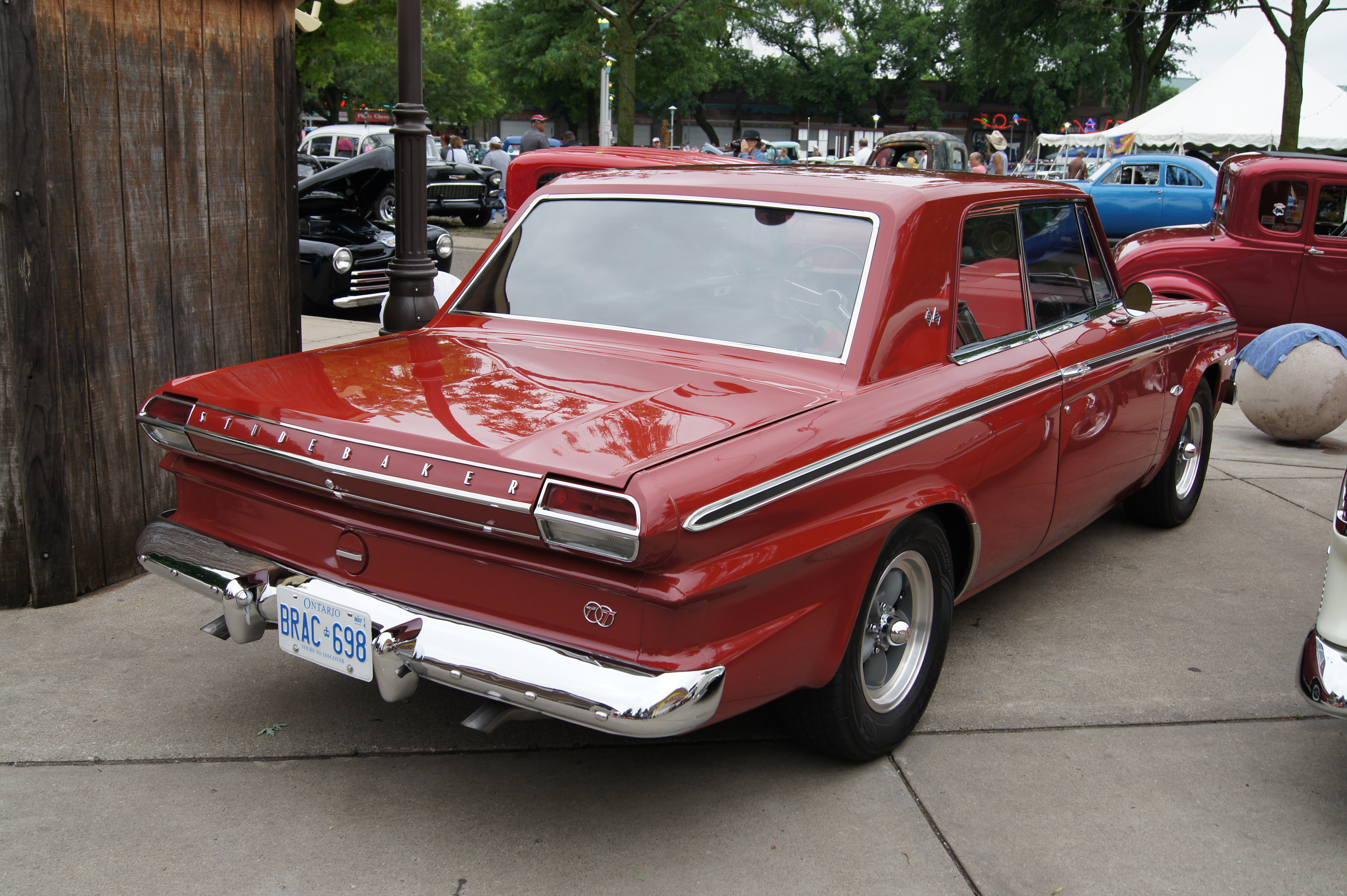
1964 Lark two-door sedan, rear view

After the South Bend closing, production continued at the Studebaker's Canadian plant in Hamilton, Ontario, which was overseen by Gordon Grundy, the president of Studebaker of Canada. Grundy was a dedicated Studebaker executive who, like Egbert before him, wanted to see Studebaker continue as a builder of automobiles.

The "second series" Canadian-built 1964 lineup was not much different from the South Bend offerings; however, the entire Challenger series (along with the Hawk, Avanti, and all trucks) was dropped. Six-cylinder Daytona models that had not previously been offered in the U.S. (but had been available in Canada and export markets) were added to the U.S. lineup.

Another new addition was the Commander Special, which combined the low-priced Commander two-door sedan with the interior of the sporty Daytona. A good value for the money, it proved mildly popular and would serve as the basis for another model in 1965.

Under the hood, all of the R-series engines were discontinued, although R-series engines continued to be assembled and sold by Paxton Products until 1967 when the necessary parts were no longer available. Engines for the Canadian built late 1964 models came from South Bend until the end of the model year by July. When the union contract ended in May 1964, the foundry was closed, however sufficient engines were built to complete the 1964 model run.

Spotters can distinguish original second-series 1964 cars by their solid white steering wheels; cars built in South Bend were built with steering wheels that either matched the interior color or were two-toned with white as the upper and lower color. Also, cars without clocks had a blank plate in the instrument cluster which read "Studebaker Corporation" on South Bend cars and "Studebaker of Canada" on Hamilton cars.

=== 1965 ===
The Studebaker model lineup was changed little for 1965; without opening the hood, it is difficult to distinguish them from the 1964 models.

With the end of engine production in South Bend, Studebaker's Hamilton plant no longer had a source of engines. The company was forced to search for an outside supplier. The small engineering staff quickly gathered and thoroughly tested engines from both General Motors and Ford. The Ford engines (basically the Falcon/Fairlane six-cylinder and V8) would not fit without expensive modifications to the cars, while the GM (Chevrolet designs built by the company's McKinnon Industries subsidiary) engines fit perfectly.

The only hang-up was how to mate the new engines to the Borg-Warner transmissions that the company preferred to continue using.

According to E.T. Reynolds, a Studebaker engineer, Checker Motors had started using Chevrolet engines in their taxicab and Marathon lines at about the same time that Studebaker began considering doing the same. Like Studebaker, Checker had long used Borg-Warner transmissions, and that company's engineers had created an adapter to mate them to the engines. Checker made its parts available to Studebaker, and the company began purchasing engines from General Motors' Canadian-subsidiary McKinnon Industries for the 1965 model year. The chosen powerplants were basically the same as found in the Chevrolet Chevy II. The Studebaker six was replaced by a 194 cu in (3.2 L) 120 hp (89 kW) six, and the well-known 283 cu in (4.6 L) 195 hp (145 kW) V8 replaced both Studebaker's 259 and 289 engines.

For 1965, the Commander was offered in two- and four-door sedan form along with a Wagonaire. The Cruiser four-door sedan was still available, as was the Daytona Wagonaire. The Daytona convertible, hardtop and four-door sedan models were all discontinued, however. Aside from the Wagonaire, the only other 1965 Daytona was the vinyl-roofed two-door sports sedan, which drew its inspiration from the late-1964 Commander Special. All models continued the 1964 design with only minor detail changes, the most significant being that the Commander gained standard quad headlamps, replacing the dual lamps that had been standard the previous year.

Sales, however, continued to plunge; fewer than 20,000 Studebakers were built in 1965, and some blamed the poor results on Studebaker of Canada's decision to make no year-to-year style changes (a plan that worked well for Volkswagen, but not for a company like Studebaker which had long made annual changes). Others, many Studebaker loyalists included, felt that the GM-powered cars built in Canada were not true Studebakers. The term "Chevybaker" was coined early on for these cars, bringing to mind the "Packardbaker" nickname of the 1957 and 1958 Packards built on the Studebaker President body.

=== 1966 ===
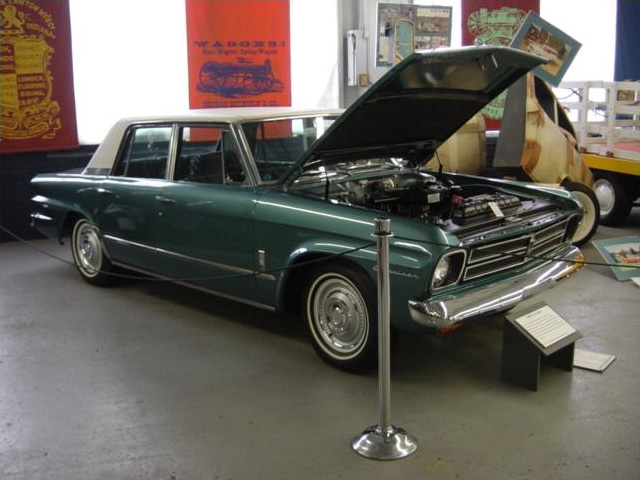
1966 Studebaker Cruiser 4-door sedan, the last factory-produced Studebaker

The 1966 Studebakers, advertised as having "the smart new look," were slightly restyled, the result of a reversal of the company's previous decision to make no annual model changes. The cars bore a stylish new grille, single headlamps, revised and simplified side trim, luxurious new interiors (even in the cheapest Commander), and other refinements. Even the famous Hawk logo was brought out of retirement, slightly redesigned, and applied to wheelcovers, grilles, and engine identification emblems on the front fenders. The redesign, which was evidently begun by Brooks Stevens, was completed by the Dearborn design firm of Marcks Hazelquist Powers.

Bob Marcks, who later worked as a designer and product planner at Chrysler, commented in a 1970s interview that the general feeling shared by both designers and management was that Studebaker's cars needed to project a more upscale image. To do this on Studebaker's limited budget, the designers chose colors and upholstery materials comparable to those seen in Cadillacs and Lincolns, rather than the plainer variety that one might expect in a lower-priced car. The tasteful nylon brocade upholstery with contrasting-color vinyl trim that was standard in the Cruiser particularly reflected this philosophy. Studebaker's final engineering innovation, flow-through "Refreshaire" ventilation with air extractor vents integrated into the taillamp assemblies, debuted on the 1966 models to wide acclaim. Refreshaire virtually eliminated the need for opening the vent windows in the front doors. In fact, the Cruiser, which had, since its 1961 introduction, been equipped with opening rear-door vent windows, lost that feature with the advent of Refreshaire.

Under the hood, a larger 230 cu in (3.8 L) 140 hp (100 kW) six-cylinder engine was added as an option, first available only with an automatic transmission. Later in the model run, however, the bigger six was made available with any of Studebaker's three transmission options.

The only change to the 1966 model lineup was that the Wagonaire was now on its own and thus no longer part of either the Commander or Daytona series. The station wagon bore "Studebaker" nameplates on its front fenders and shared the Commander's grille and exterior trim, but had a Daytona-grade interior. The fixed-roof option returned after a one-year hiatus, and the rear-facing third seat was dropped from the option list.

All of the other models, Commander, Daytona and Cruiser, were continued. The Commander, however, received some notable additional standard equipment in January 1966 as the company began including the Climatizer heater/defroster, windshield washer, and other items at no additional cost.

Despite the clever restyling, luxurious interiors, engineering advancements, and added standard equipment, sales were not enough to satisfy the Studebaker board. Actually no reasonable number would have satisfied the board, which was determined to exit the auto business. According to Gordon Grundy the Canadian operation earned between one and two million each year after the move, a truth never revealed by South Bend which turned a blind eye. The press, if they mentioned Studebaker at all, might have just stated an after thought like Road & Track did in 1966, saying in a new-car issue that "Studebakers are still being built," or like another publication "doing everything but turning over." There were no North American auto publications willing to lend a hand to the oldest vehicle maker in the world, save the Canadian Track and Traffic. The operation could have succeeded and even thrived, especially under a plan whereby Canadian Motor Industries (CMI) would take over Studebaker production and plants, thereby releasing the board and South Bend once and for all. This plan which included distribution rights for Toyota, and rebadging some Isuzu Belletts as Studebakers. The regular lineup of Studebaker models would also continue. There was even talk of reviving the Avanti line. Whether this would have entailed an agreement with Newman & Altman of South Bend to build the Avanti independently or another agreement is not known as the CMI story fell apart just before it was to take effect. There were many possibilities in the works in 1966 just as there had been with Packard in 1956. Had any fork in the road been taken, Studebaker may have survived to this day, but the will simply was no longer there. Gordon Grundy had made an all out effort to keep the automobiles rolling just as had Packard's James Nance.

Most of the board in South Bend sensed the shutdown two years earlier as the first step in ending auto production completely, but surviving evidence indicates that they did not inform Gordon Grundy of this. Grundy, who along with his small staff, had been working with Marcks Hazelquist Powers on a facelifted 1967 model and into 1970, approached the board in early 1966 seeking less than $300,000 in tooling funds (a pittance by Detroit standards) for the job. What emerged was a redesigned rear bumper designed to minimize the car's "high" rear. Much to his dismay, he was told that there would be no 1967 production. The board then moved to close Hamilton as soon as possible, and the last Studebaker car, a Timberline Turquoise Cruiser four-door sedan, was built on March 16, 1966 (some sources claim the car was built on March 17). It was the last of only 8,935 (some sources incorrectly state 8,947) Studebakers built for 1966 and the end of a transportation legacy that stretched back some 114 years.

== End of production models ==
The last South Bend car and the last Canadian car are on display at the Studebaker National Museum in South Bend, Indiana. The final U.S. built Lark-type was retained by the company instead of being delivered to the Pennsylvania dealer who had ordered it. The car has approximately 30 mi (48 km) on its odometer. The final Canadian car, a 1966 Cruiser, was driven several thousand miles by a company executive (records indicate that it was built for delivery to the company's Parts and Service Division in South Bend). It was eventually retired to the company's collection and has been restored in recent years to as-new condition.

Ilin Plant at Haifa, Israel, continued to produce the car into 1967. Thought was given by this plant to a rather heavy facelift and continued production, separate from the parent company. Some prototype designs have shown up on the internet.

== Special Larks ==
The Lark's body-on-frame construction made it very easy for custom coachbuilders and designers to create new interpretations of the cars both for Studebaker and for others who wanted something "a little different."

The noted Italian coachbuilder and designer Pietro Frua rebodied a very small number of Larks in 1960. Two four-door sedans are known to still exist, but both are in need of extensive restoration. It appears that at least one two-door model was also built, but it is not known if this car still exists. The Frua Larks are notable for their distinctive straight-lined bodies and generous use of glass.

In addition, American designer Brooks Stevens created several special concept cars on the basic Lark chassis. Three of these cars, a four-door sedan with suicide doors, a sliding-roof station wagon (called the Skyview) and a two-door Sceptre sports coupe exist today and are housed in the Studebaker National Museum.

The Lark convertible lent its reinforced X-frame chassis to the Avanti and to Brooks Stevens' Excalibur, both of which would be manufactured in limited numbers long after Studebaker was out of the automotive business, although Excalibur switched to a custom-designed chassis when its supply of Studebaker frames ran out. Avanti Motors would continue to use the basic chassis into the early 1980s.

The Israeli presidential car in 1964 was a specially designed LWB Lark. It was a four-door convertible. It had a short life due to technical problems.

- Although Studebaker phased out the Lark name in 1964, many Studebaker collectors and enthusiasts refer to the 1964-66 Studebaker sedans and station wagons (excluding Avanti and Hawk models) as "Lark-types".
- From 1959 to 1961, six-cylinder Larks were identified as "Lark VI" models, while V8-powered cars bore nameplates identifying them as "Lark VIII" models. Novices in the Studebaker hobby sometimes erroneously refer to these cars as "Mark VI" and "Mark VIII" Larks (not to be confused with the Lincolns of the same names).
- The early Lark four-door sedan's body was used to create the cab section of the 1960 Studebaker Champ pickup, Studebaker's last "all-new" truck design. A new back cab wall was created, with the front doors, dashboard and front sheetmetal largely unaltered from those of the car. A more "truck-like" grille was added to the Champ, but otherwise the bodies of the 1959-60 Larks and all Champs built from 1960 to 1964 share a great deal of their body components. In fact, some export market Champs were even built on the long-wheelbase Cruiser chassis instead of the truck chassis. None were sold in the U.S.
- A rear-facing third seat was optional on station wagons from 1959 to 1965. Wagons with this option did not come with a spare tire. Instead they came with special "Captive-Air" tires that had an inner lining that allowed the car to be driven even if the outer tire were punctured.

== Australian production ==
Beginning in late 1960, the Studebaker Lark was also produced in Australia with the Canada Cycle & Motor Co (Vic) Pty Ltd having been granted the rights to build Studebakers under license in that country. Australian production ceased in 1966 although 1965 models rather than current models were assembled in that final year.
