= Studebaker Wagonaire =

Cars developed and produced by Studebaker Corporation

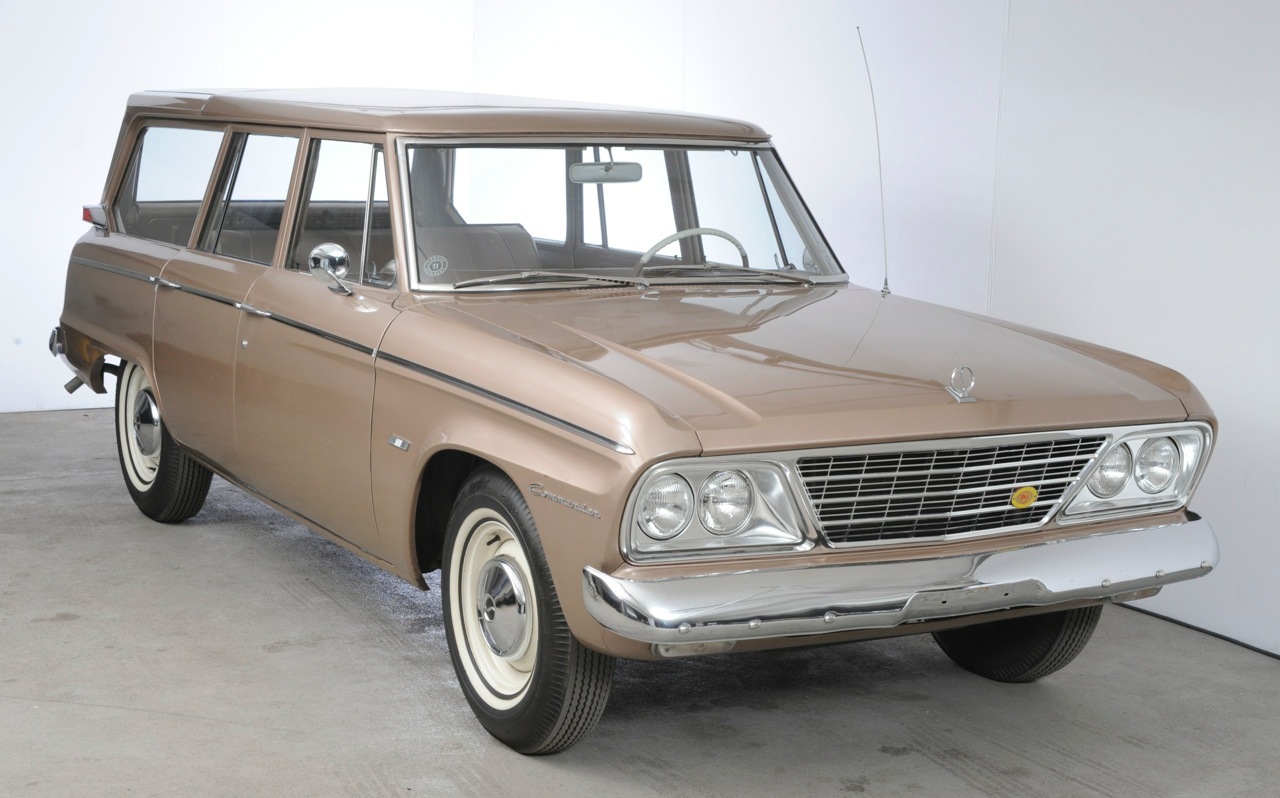

Overview
- Manufacturer: Studebaker
- Production: 1963–1966
- Assembly: Studebaker Automotive Plant, South Bend, Indiana, United States; Studebaker Canada, Hamilton, Ontario, Canada; Studebaker Australia, Melbourne, Victoria, Australia

Body and chassis
- Body style: 4-door station wagon
- Layout: FR layout
- Related: Studebaker Lark

Powertrain
- Engine: 194 cu in (3.18 L) I6; 3.8 L Chevrolet 230 I6; 283 cu in (4.64 L) V8

The Studebaker Wagonaire was a station wagon produced by the Studebaker Corporation of South Bend, Indiana, from 1963–1966. It featured a retractable sliding rear roof section that allowed the vehicle to carry items that would otherwise be too tall for a conventional station wagon of the era.

== Development ==
Studebaker Wagonaire's roof design was the invention of industrial designer Brooks Stevens, who was charged by the automaker's president, Sherwood Egbert, to expand the company's limited model range without spending vast amounts of capital on retooling. Stevens was also the designer of the similarly named Jeep Wagoneer, a truck-based sport utility vehicle (SUV) that was also introduced along the Wagonaire for the 1963 model year.

The Wagonaire roof design was inspired by Stevens' 1959 Scimitar concept car built in Stuttgart, West Germany, by Ruetter for the Olin Mathieson Chemical Corporation. There were three full-sized Chrysler-based vehicles built for display at the 1959 Geneva Motor Show to promote use of aluminum in building cars. One of these was a hardtop (with no "B-pillar") station wagon with a sliding roof panel. In 1962, Stevens developed prototypes for a new line Studebakers that included a station wagon named "Skyview" that featured a partially retractable rear roof section. However, the automaker had no resources to develop new cars so Stevens came up with low-cost updates to modernize the Lark line.

Studebaker developed the Wagonaire version using the standard Lark station wagon body that was modified above the beltline. The roof was designed with a panel over the cargo bay that was manually retracted into and then locked into position in the forward section of the roof. The mechanism includes a simple pair of tracks that allow the rear roof panel to slide forward over the headliner which is lowered to provide clearance. This configuration allowed Studebaker to boast that the Wagonaire could transport items (such as standard size refrigerators) in an upright position. Wagonaires seated six passengers (five with the optional front bucket seats). The car could seat eight when equipped with a rear-facing third-row seat, which was available as an option through 1965. When the third seat was ordered, the cars were fitted with special "Captive-Air" (puncture-resistant) tires, as the additional seat took up the space required for a spare tire and wheel. The drop-down tailgate was available with an attached step to ease egress.

The design of the Studebaker Wagonaire has been noted as possibly the first "crossover" vehicle.

== Production ==
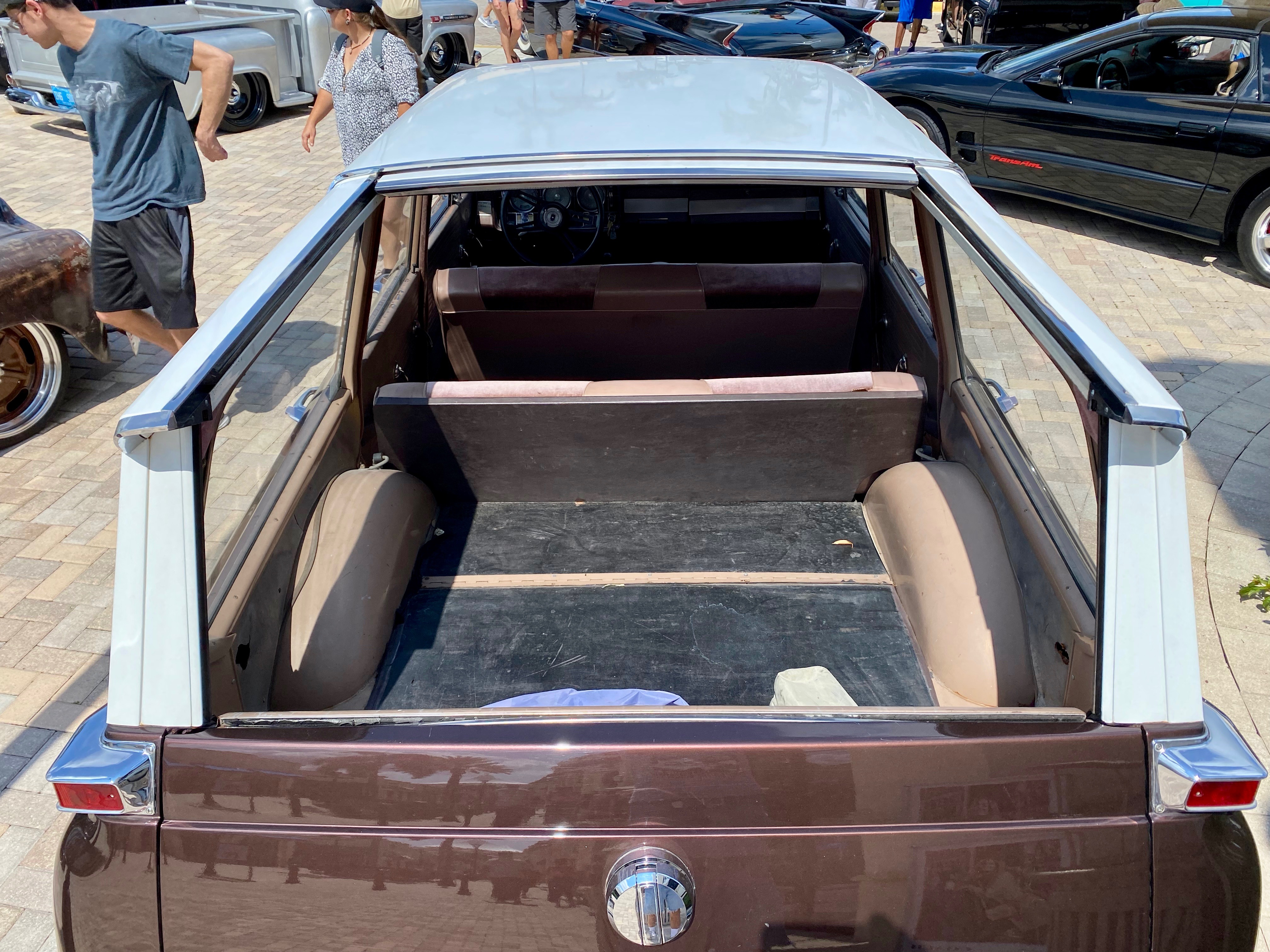
1965 Studebaker Commander Wagonaire with roof opened

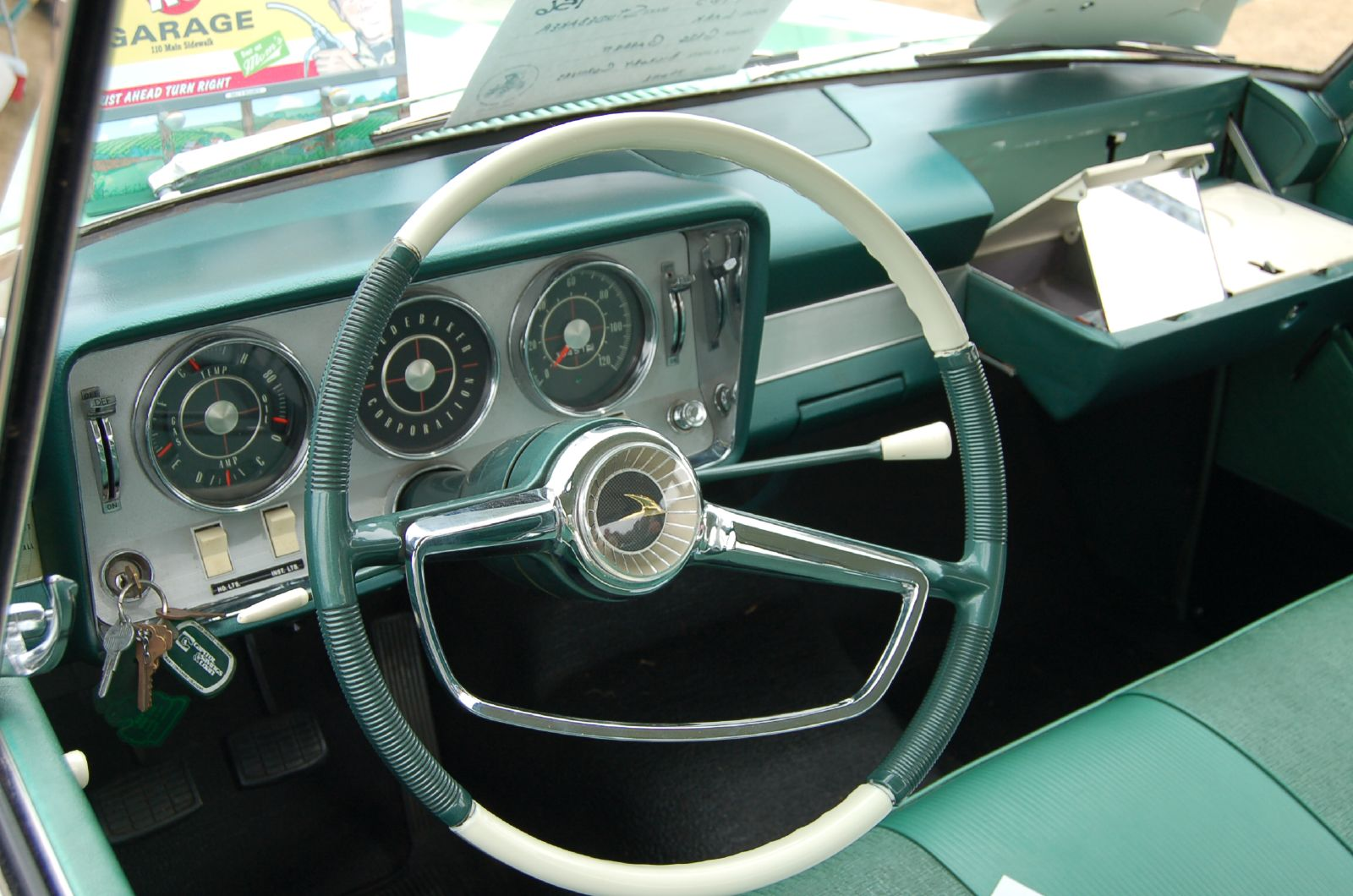
1963 Studebaker Wagonaire interior

Production began in the autumn of 1962 for the 1963 model year with all Lark station wagons including the sliding roof. However, early buyers soon found that their new wagons' roofs leaked water near the front of the sliding section. This problem was addressed – with limited success – by the factory. It took until mid-November to develop a suitable solution to resume volume production. While the early roof seals were redesigned and improved, it was also critical that the drainage tubes in the roof slider assembly be kept clear. A series of service letters were sent to dealers to address this problem, but early negative reports probably tarnished the design.

Fixed-roof station wagons were rushed into production alongside the Wagonaire and became available in January 1963. These sold for US$100 less than the sliding-roof wagons, but it was technically a "delete option" and not a separate model. Studebaker built a total of 11,915 fixed and sliding roof station wagons for the initial year.

When Studebaker closed its South Bend, Indiana, assembly plant and continued production at its Hamilton, Ontario, Canada, plant, the company discontinued the Avanti and Hawk, but continued to build the Lark-based sedans and Wagonaire station wagons. A total of 1,563 Daytona Wagonaires were built in 1964.

The 1964 models, which were built only in Canada after December 1963, were the last to carry Studebaker's engines. Beginning with the 1965 models, General Motors supplied engines based on the Chevrolet six-cylinder and V8 designs. The 1965 models were available only with the sliding roof.

The fixed-roof option made a return for Studebaker's final model year in 1966, but the third seat was no longer offered. In addition, the 1966 Wagonaire finally was made a model in its own right, blending the exterior features of the Commander with the interior trim grade of the sporty Daytona. There were also fixed-top Wagonaires available in 1966; while a total of 618 of all types of Wagonaires were built for the 1966 model year.

Over the four-year production, a total of about 12,000 sliding-roof Wagonaires were sold.

== Daytona version ==
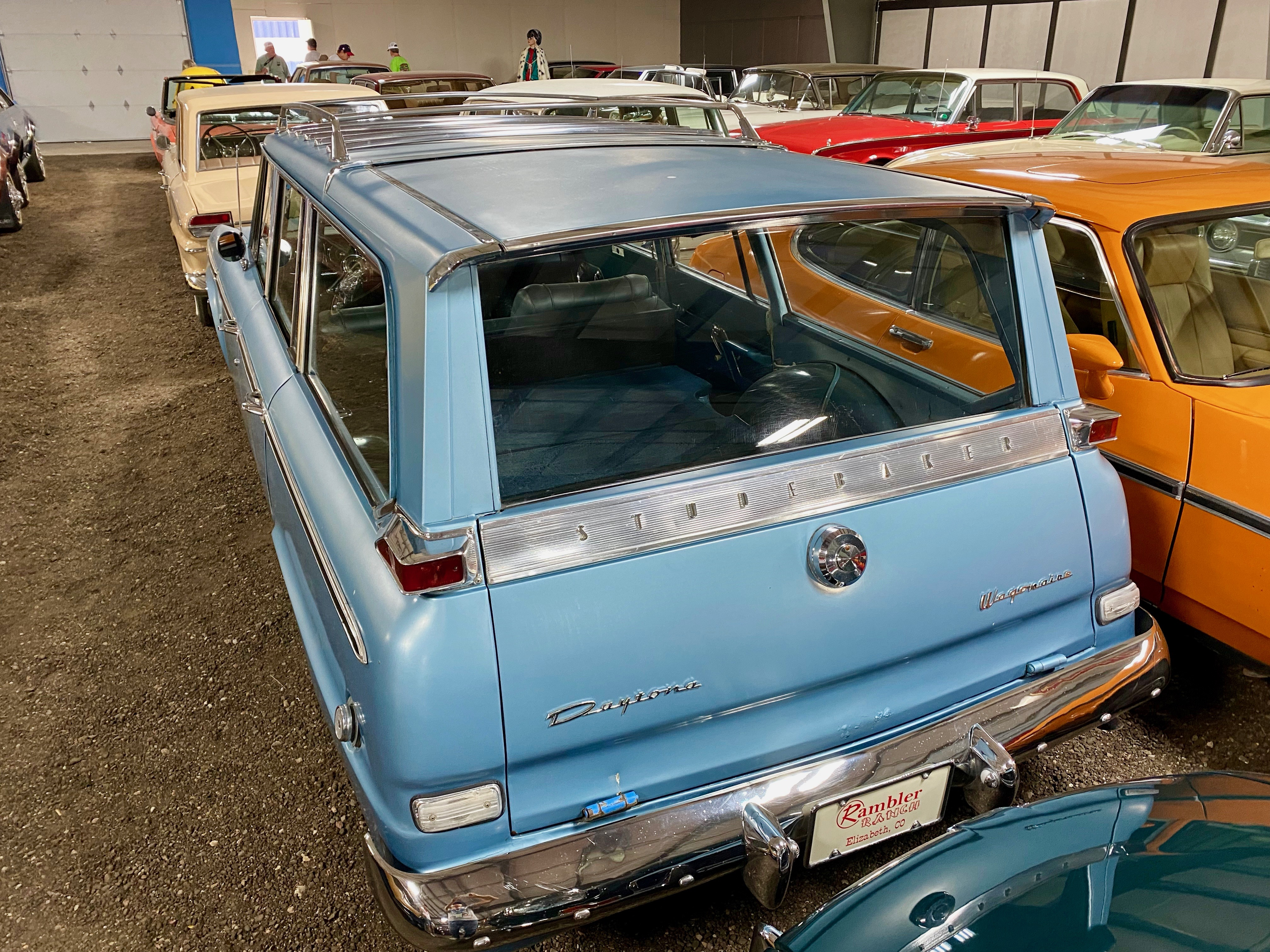
Studebaker Daytona Wagonaire at the Rambler Ranch

The 1963 and 1964 Daytona trim versions of the Wagonaire could be equipped with a V8 engine and disk brakes. Other options included a Carter 4-barrel carburetor and a column mounted shifter manual transmission with overdrive. Bucket front seats along with a center console-mounted automatic transmission selector also were available. The Wagonaire could also be ordered with any of Studebaker's available "R-series" high-performance Avanti V8 engines and a four-speed floor-shift manual transmission.

== Scale models ==
Matchbox-Lesney made a miniature Wagonaire that included a sliding roof section. The scale model was available for many years after Studebaker stopped production of the actual vehicle. Husky Toys also manufactured a model Wagonaire that was similar in size to the Matchbox product and also featured the sliding rear roof panel.

== Revival of the concept ==
The concept of the retractable roof was picked up by General Motors for a model in its GMC Envoy line in 2003 as a 2004 model. Advertisements for the new Envoy XUV incorrectly touted the feature as "first-ever". An additional feature adopted by GMC was the power operation of the roof section and a movable partition between the passenger area and cargo space. The Envoy XUV model was discontinued in 2005. Similarly to the record of Studebaker's innovative Wagonaire, General Motors also produced about 12,000 sliding roof XUVs during the single model year it was offered.
