= 1957 and 1958 Packards =

Car model

The 1957 and 1958 Packard lineup of automobiles were based on Studebaker models: restyled, rebadged, and given more luxurious interiors. After 1956 production, the Packard engine and transmission factory was leased to the Curtiss-Wright Corporation while the assembly plant on Detroit's East Grand Boulevard was sold, ending the line of Packard-built cars. However, Studebaker-Packard executives hoped to keep the Packard name alive until a fully restyled model could be funded, developed, and produced. These cars were built in hopes that enough would be sold to enable the company to design and build a completely new luxury Packard.

== 1957 Packard Clipper ==
For the 1957 model year, Studebaker-Packard took its top-of-the-line model, the President, and added a revised front clip with new fenders and hoods while using the 56 Packard Front Bumper. The Packard Clipper emblem was used in the grille to replicate the styling of the 56 Clipper. The designers also changed the quarter panels to accept 1956 Packard taillights. along with a Packard dash gauges from the 1956 to make a new dash board for the Packard. and called the car the Packard Clipper. Two models were produced in 1957, a four-door Town Sedan and a station wagon Clipper Country Sedan.

Carryover parts from earlier Packard models included taillights, wheel covers, block letters on hood, instruments and radios. The headlight 'eyebrows' and front bumper assembly were styled for a Packard appearance. A 1955 hood ornament was modified to fit the Studebaker hood shape and the long, wide side trim was designed to be reminiscent of recent Packard trim. A stamped overlay for the lower rear fenders also gave them a body crease line suggestive of the side trim of the 1956 Caribbean.

Dashboard and interior were all Packard styled. Some former president features like the rear folding seat armrest and faired-in door armrests were reserved for the Clippers, with the addition of door mounted ashtrays, thick pile carpeting, and exclusive Packard-style cloth/vinyl fabrics. Other unique features included under-dash courtesy lights, fully padded dash top (that did not hold up well long term in the sun), padded sun visors, and gold-plated horn ring.

When Packard dealers saw the resulting car at regional previews, the response was quick, angry, and loud. Many dealers felt the Clipper was too similar to the Studebaker on which it was based and dropped Packard completely. Sales were a low 4,809, almost all of which were the Town Sedan. Critics bestowed the derisive name "Packardbaker" on the cars.

In order to produce an engine of appropriate power for a Packard, a McCulloch-supercharged version of Studebaker's 289 in^{3} (4.7 L) small-block V8 was used, giving 275 bhp (205 kW), equivalent to the Packard engines in use the year before (and likewise used in the Studebaker Golden Hawk). Since the Studebaker-bodied cars were quite a bit lighter than the previous year's Packards, the 1957 Packard range actually had quite exceptional performance for the time.

Writer and auto historian Richard Langworth has noted that while these cars were not truly Packards, they were, however, very good Studebakers.

== Final Packards ==
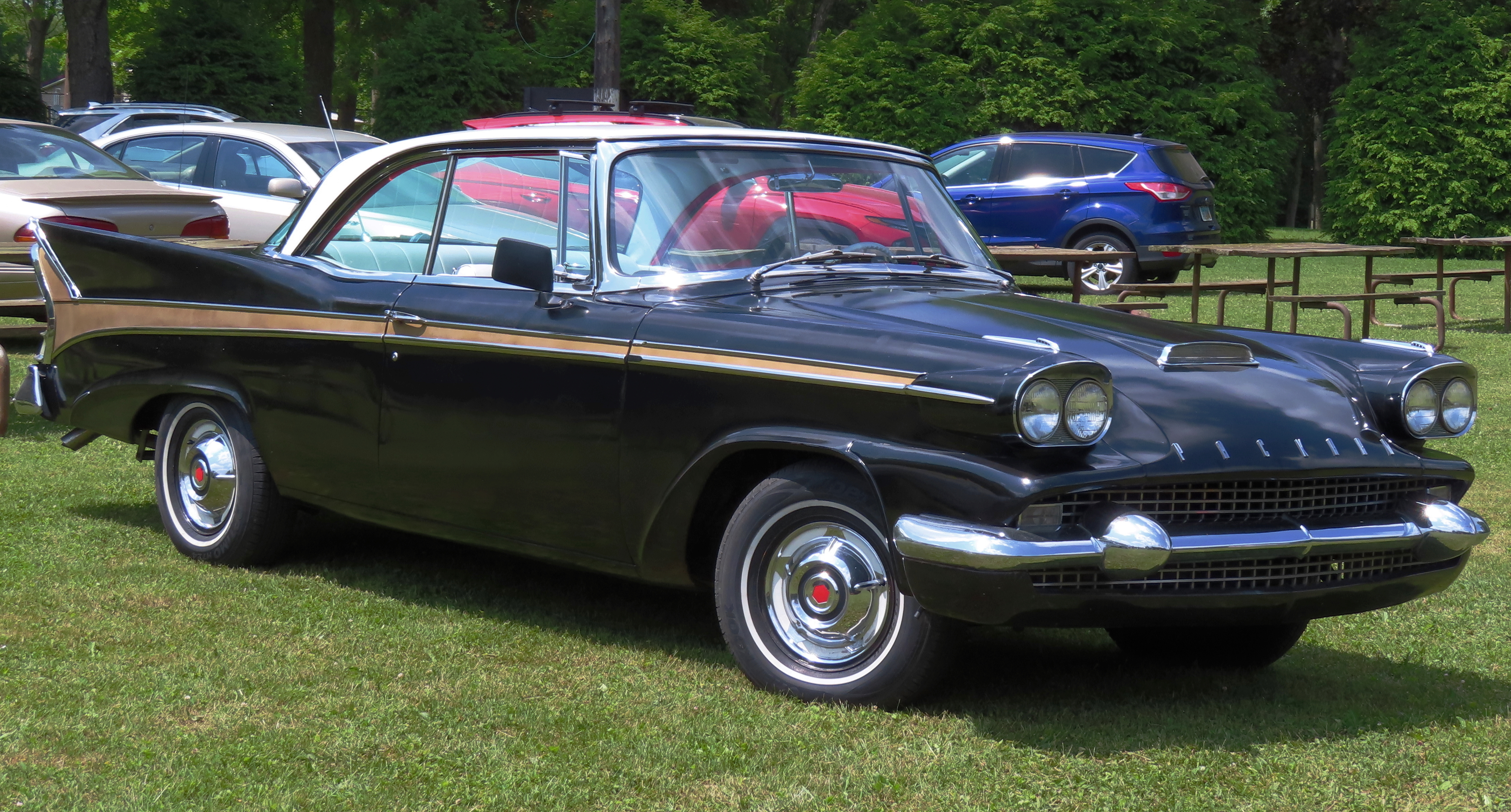
1958 Packard 2-door hardtop coupe

1958 saw the Packard line expanded to four models; a 4-door sedan, a 2-door hardtop (sometimes referred to as the "Starlight", a name used by Studebaker), a 4-door station wagon, and the Packard Hawk, a modification of Studebaker's Golden Hawk with a "fishmouth" Packard grille.

Restyled by Duncan McRae, Studebaker-Packard's finances dictated that the changes for 1958 be made as cheaply as possible. Quad headlights, as on Studebakers, were achieved by affixing pods to the previous year's front fenders designed for two headlights. In the rear, McRae attempted to follow the tailfin craze established by Chrysler's 1957 "Forward Look" by crafting outward-canted steel fin extensions that were mounted to the tops of the existing vertical rear fenders, they were very reminiscent of the 1957 Dodge Custom Royal in styling. This same trick of adding fins was used by Studebaker on the 1957 Hawks and the Raymond Loewy designed Rootes group cars of 1957. 1956 Clipper taillight units continued to be used. Packards also adopted a low, wide "fishmouth" grille to further distinguish them from their Studebaker cousins. Other notable changes included the hardtops' astonishingly attractive rooflines, very similar to concurrent Chrysler/Desoto designs. Also, the switch to a one-piece drive shaft allowed Studebaker engineers to flatten the floor, which also allowed flattening of the roof panels on sedan and hardtop models. Packard (and Studebaker) also switched to 14" wheels so most 1958 models are noticeably lower.

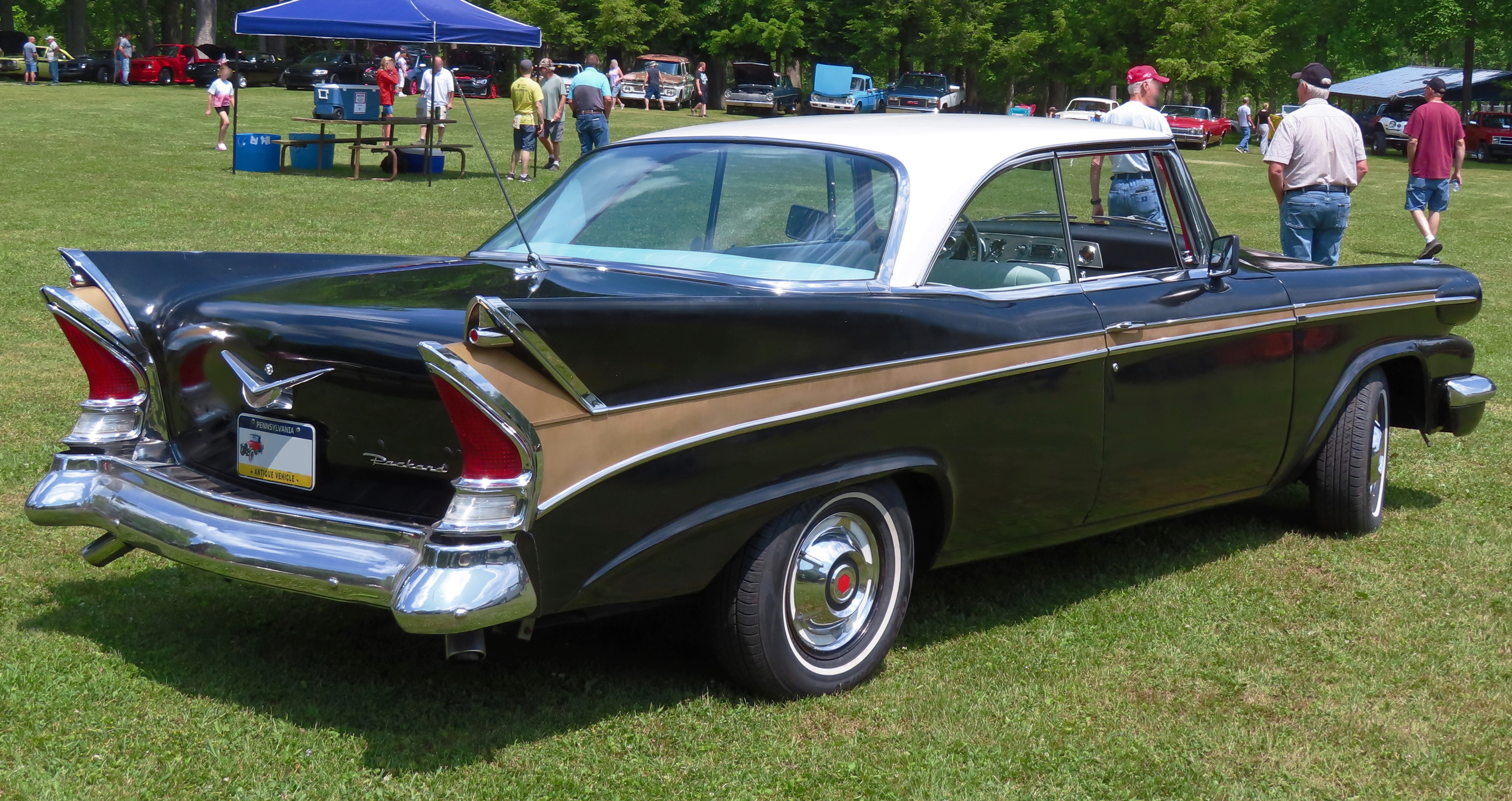
1958 Packard's grafted tailfins on 1956 Clipper taillights.

Despite McRae's efforts, the car that emerged appeared cobbled together, rather than as a cohesive design. Auto reviewer "Uncle" Tom McCahill remarked that from the rear it looked as if the cars had been left in the sun too long and the canted fiberglass fins had started to melt down the straight rear fender sides.

Only 2,034 of the three standard models (sedan, hardtop and station wagon) were produced; an additional 588 Packard Hawks were built as well. The rarest of all '58 Packards is the station wagon, with only 159 produced. The last Packard rolled off the South Bend assembly line on July 25, 1958.

In 1962 the Studebaker-Packard Corporation officially dropped "Packard" from its name.

== Trivia ==
A pink, purple, and gold 1958 Packard estate car is seen in the 2001 film Hearts in Atlantis.
