= Sherwood Egbert =

American businessman (1920–1969)

Sherwood Harry Egbert (July 24, 1920 – 1969) was an American businessman, noted for his role as president of the Studebaker-Packard Corporation and Studebaker Corporation from F1961 to 1963.

== Background ==
Egbert was born July 24, 1920, in Easton, Kittitas County, Washington, and studied engineering at Washington State University for two years. In 1942, he joined the United States Marine Corps and became a major. He served in the South Pacific.

Joining Studebaker from the McCulloch Motors Corporation, with no experience of the automobile industry, Egbert replaced former president Harold E. Churchill under a corporate goal of diversification—to get the company out of carmaking and "absorb Studebaker's tax loss credits ($94 million) by merging with prosperous companies". Instead, Egbert took a genuine interest in the cars and moved his home to the Studebaker proving grounds lodge. He set out to resurrect the auto division's flagging fortunes, encouraged by industry reports of projected sales figures that indicated that there would still be room for a smaller manufacturer.

He initiated production of the stylish Avanti, based on a Lark chassis and drivetrain with fiberglass bodywork designed by a team headed by Raymond Loewy. The car was in production by the spring of 1962, insufficient lead time for comprehensive assembly and distribution of the many orders soon received. He had hoped to sell 20,000 Avantis that year but could only build 1200. To revamp the Studebaker passenger cars, Egbert hired Brooks Stevens "on a minuscule budget", with good results such as the Gran Turismo Hawk; overall sales continued to be well below the break-even point.

Disagreements between Egbert and Studebaker's board of directors exacerbated the illness with which he was diagnosed in 1962. Cancer surgeries and lengthy recuperation absence allowed the board to ease him out of office, replacing him as president with Byers A. Burlingame. He resigned on November 24, 1963. Studebaker closed its U.S. auto manufacturing operations just a month later. Production was moved to the Canadian plant where Studebaker continued building cars until March 1966.

In 1964 Egbert established a management consulting firm in Los Angeles.

Egbert died in Los Angeles in 1969.

== See also ==
- Excalibur (automobile)
