= Studebaker-Packard Corporation =

Former automobile manufacturer

- Predecessors: Studebaker Corporation; Packard Motor Car Company
- Founded: 1954; 72 years ago

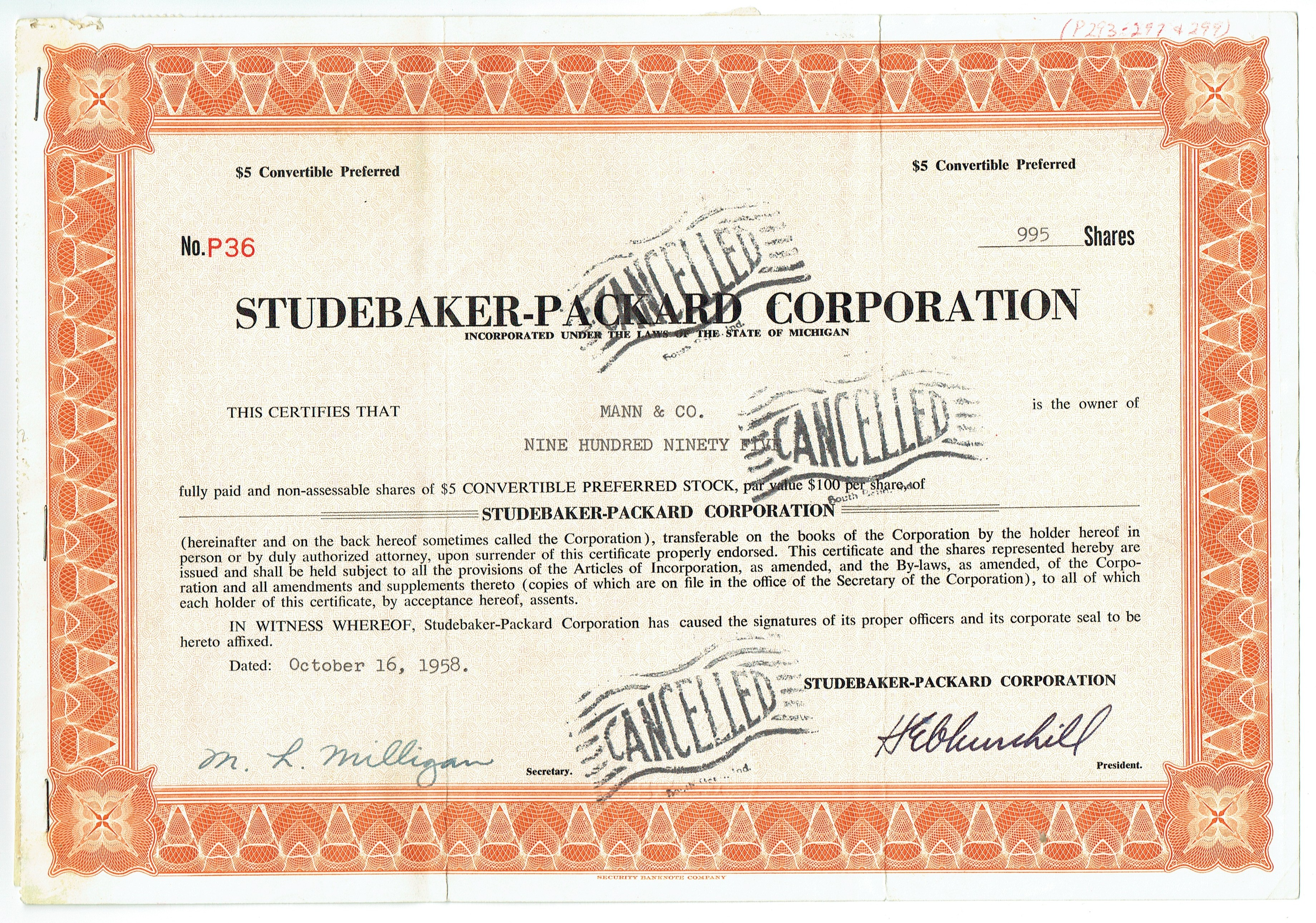
Share of the Studebaker-Packard Corporation, issued 16 October 1958

The Studebaker-Packard Corporation is the entity created in 1954 by the purchase of the Studebaker Corporation of South Bend, Indiana, by the Packard Motor Car Company of Detroit, Michigan. While Studebaker was the larger of the two companies, Packard's balance sheet and executive team were stronger than that of the South Bend company.

In the spring of 1962, Studebaker-Packard reverted its name to "Studebaker Corporation". The following year, the South Bend plant was closed, while its Canadian plant in Hamilton, Ontario, continued to produce Studebaker cars until 1966. The South Bend plant would later be acquired by the Avanti Motor Company.

Studebaker Corp. merged with Worthington Corporation one year later. Studebaker-Worthington was a diversified American manufacturer operating the various business units of Studebaker, Wagner Electric and Worthington Corporation. The company was in turn acquired by McGraw-Edison in 1979.

== Purposes of merger ==
It was hoped that Packard would benefit from Studebaker's larger dealer network. Studebaker hoped to gain through the additional strength that Packard's cash position could provide. Once both companies stabilized their balance sheets and strengthened their product line, the original plan devised by Packard president James J. Nance and Nash-Kelvinator Corporation president George W. Mason was that the combined Studebaker-Packard company would join a combined Nash-Kelvinator Corporation and Hudson Motor Car Company in an all-new four-marque American Motors Corporation.

Had the complicated set of combinations gone through as planned, the new company would have immediately surpassed the Chrysler Corporation to become the third of America's "Big Three" automobile manufacturers. However, the sudden death of Mason in 1954 (succeeded by George W. Romney) and disputes over parts-sharing arrangements between the companies doomed any chance of completing the proposed merger. This failure to combine the companies effectively sealed the fates of all four, though American Motors survived until its own buyout by Chrysler in 1987.

Packard executives soon discovered that Studebaker had been less than forthcoming in all of its financial and sales records. The situation was considerably more dire than Nance and his team were led to believe; Studebaker's break-even point was an unreachable 282,000 cars at a time when the company had barely sold 82,000 cars in 1954. Furthering the new company's problems was the loss of about 30% of Studebaker's dealer network by 1956.

Studebaker-Packard tried a company reorganization in which Studebaker took the part of the volume and commercial car and truck seller from South Bend while Packard was to re-occupy the luxury market - one of Nance's targets since he took over Packard's presidency in 1952. The gap in between was filled by a new make, the Clipper. Technically, it was a lighter Packard, built in Detroit alongside the senior cars. The next generation of cars would have to be concentrated on one location, and there was a detailed program for sharing as much sheet metal as possible. Although Nance was presumably right, dealer resistance against the Clipper as a new entry in the intermediate field was big. Dealers complained that the only thing that allowed them to sell Clippers was the prestige, though declining, of the Packard name on the car itself.

Following a disastrous sales year in 1956, Nance resigned and Studebaker-Packard entered a management agreement with the Curtiss-Wright Corporation. Curtiss, led by Roy T. Hurley, insisted on major changes. All of Studebaker-Packard's defense contracts and plants where defense work was carried out were picked up by Curtiss, Packard production in Detroit was stopped and all remaining automotive efforts were shifted to South Bend.

== "Packardbakers" ==
The Packards (for 1957 and 1958) were essentially Studebaker Presidents with a redesigned front clip using Packard parts and redesigned interior and tail of the car also using Packard parts. The vehicles were referred to as "Packardbakers". The final Packard rolled off the assembly line on July 25, 1958. That year, Studebaker instructed company personnel to sell their Packards and use only Studebakers.

Hurley was able to negotiate the distribution rights of the Mercedes Benz automobile brand in the USA exclusively owned by SP. Daimler Benz. The agreement was looked on as a necessity both for the income that Mercedes-Benz could add to the company's bottom line and as another product that the Studebaker dealer network could sell in the event that the company quit building its own cars.

Studebaker-Packard Corporation made numerous attempts at resurrecting the Packard nameplate. The French Facel-Vega four-door sedan, which was powered by a Chrysler V8 engine, would have been supplied the basis of a new Packard. Additional work was done with the Ford Motor Company to use the 1956 Lincoln bodies that Ford was eliminating. Studebaker Corporation in 1965 sold back to Daimler-Benz, Mercedes-Benz of North America which was distributing Mercedes in the USA.

== Diversification ==
In 1960, the company began diversification efforts by buying:

- D. W. Onan & Sons - Generators & engines
- Cincinnati Testing Labs - Plastics research
- Gering Plastics - Plastics manufacture
- Clarke Floor Machine Company - Floor cleaners & buffers
- Gravely Tractors - Quality lawnmowers
- Chemical Compounds Company - Maker of STP additives

In 1961 Sherwood Egbert was appointed company president. He was expected to help diversify the company. In the spring of 1962, four years after the last Packard car rolled off the assembly line, and eight years following the merger between Packard and Studebaker, the company dropped 'Packard' from its legal name, which returned to being 'Studebaker Corporation'.
