= List of Studebaker vehicles =

Lark

The following list consists of automotive models produced by the Studebaker Corporation of South Bend, Indiana from 1899 to 1963 and Studebaker Canada Ltd. from 1964 through the spring 1966. In 1961, many of these were offered with special Marshal (police) packages: a 170 cu in (2.8 L) 6-cylinder City Marshal, 259 cu in (4.2 L) V8 Patrol Marshal, and 289 cu in (4.7 L) V8 Pursuit Marshal. There was also a heavy-duty four-door taxicab based on a stretched-wheelbase Cruiser.

== Cars ==
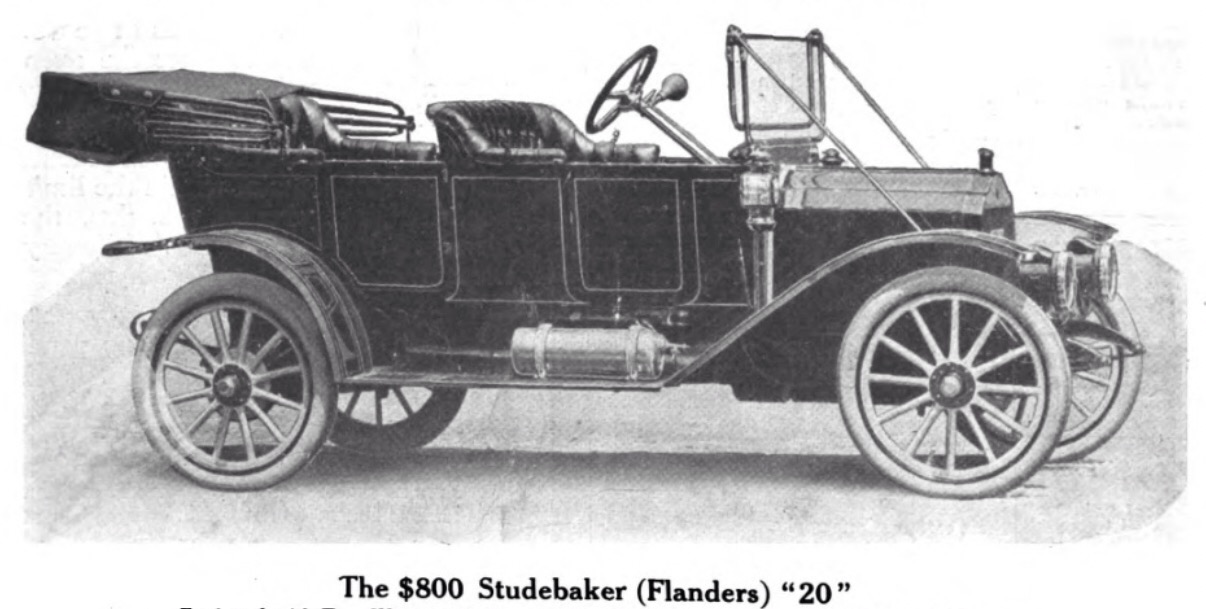
Studebaker Flanders 20

- 1902–1912 Electric
- 1904–1905 Studebaker 9502
- 1905 Studebaker 9503
- 1906 Studebaker E 20
- 1906 Studebaker F 28
- 1906–1909 Studebaker G 30
- 1907–1910 Studebaker H
- 1907 Studebaker L
- 1908–1909 Studebaker A
- 1908–1909 Studebaker B
- 1909– Studebaker E-M-F 30
- 1909– Studebaker D
- 1910– Studebaker Flanders 20
- 1910– Studebaker Garford G7
- 1918–1919 Light Four
- 1918–1926 Big Six
- 1918–1921 Light Six
- 1918–1927 Special Six
- 1924–1927 Standard Six
- 1926–1942, 1955–1958 President
- 1927–1934, 1937–1958, 1963–1966 Commander
- 1927–1937 Dictator
- 1933–1942, 1947–1954 Land Cruiser
- 1939–1958 Champion
- 1947–1952 Starlight
- 1954–1955 Conestoga
- 1955 Speedster
- 1956–1964 Hawk series
  - 1956 Flight Hawk
  - 1956 Power Hawk
  - 1956 Sky Hawk
  - 1956–1958 Golden Hawk
  - 1957–1959 Silver Hawk
  - 1960–1961 Hawk
  - 1962–1964 Studebaker Gran Turismo Hawk
- 1956–1958, 1960–1963 Transtar
- 1957 & 1958 Packard
- 1957–1958 Scotsman
- 1957 Packard Clipper
- 1958 Packard Hawk
- 1959–1966 Lark
- 1961–1966 Cruiser
- 1962–1963 Avanti
- 1962–1966 Daytona
- 1963–1966 Wagonaire

== Trucks ==
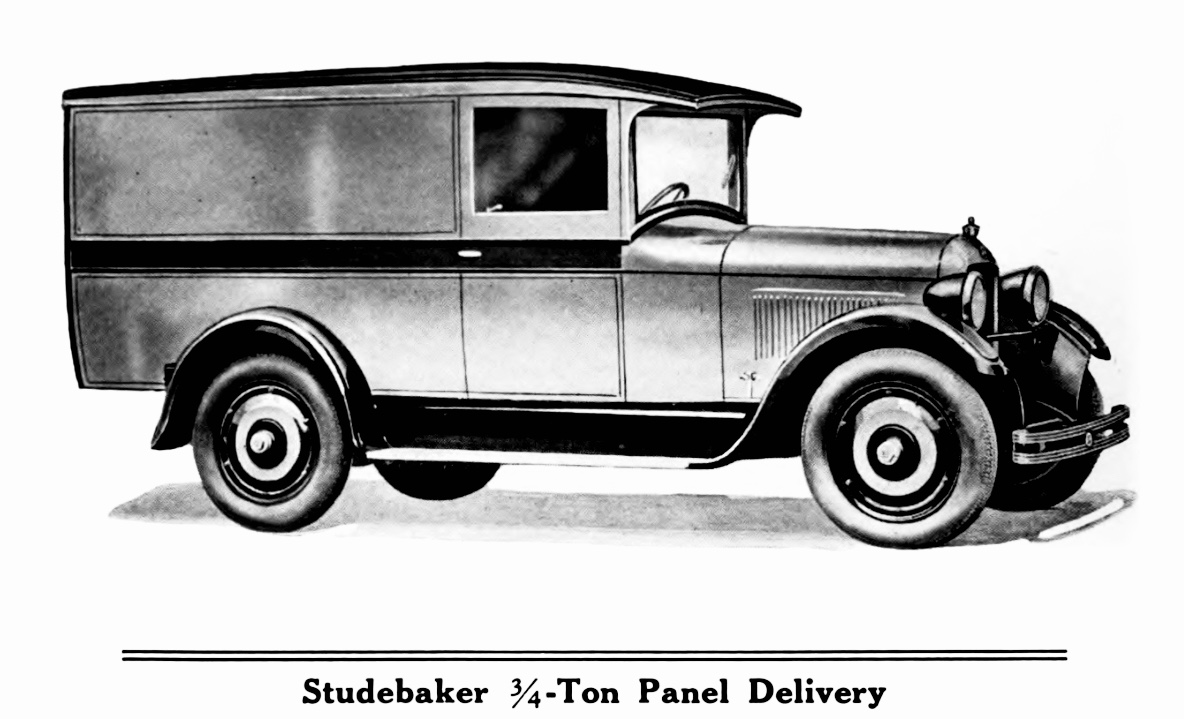
Studebaker GN 20 (1928–1930)

- 1928–1930 GN 20
- 1937 J-series
- 1937–1939 Coupe Express
- 1938–1940 K-series
- 1941–1942, 1945–1952 M-series
- 1941–1945 US6 (G630)
- 1942–1944 M29 Weasel
- 1949–1953 2R-series
- 1954 3R-series
- 1955–1964 E-series
- 1956–1958, 1960–1963 Transtar
- 1958–1959 Scotsman
- 1960–1964 Champ
- 1963 Zip Van

== Concepts ==
- 1947 Champion Woody Wagon
- 1951 Manta Ray
- 1953 Z-87
- 1962 Skyview
- 1962 Turtle
- 1963 Sceptre
- 1963 Westinghouse Delivery
- 1964 GT Hawk
- 1964 Avanti R4

== Other automotive brands owned by Studebaker ==
- Clipper
- E-M-F Automobiles
- Erskine
- Packard
- Pierce-Arrow
- Rockne
- SPA Truck Company
- Studebaker-Garford
