= Studebaker (disambiguation) =

Studebaker was an American wagon and automobile manufacturer. Studebaker may also refer to:

- Studebaker Building (disambiguation)
- List of Studebaker vehicles
- Studebaker-Packard Corporation
- Studebaker Canada

== People with the name ==
- Studebaker auto manufacturer family
  - Clement Studebaker (1831–1901), American automobile pioneer
  - Clement Studebaker Jr. (1871–1932), American automobile manufacturer
  - John Studebaker (1833–1917), American automobile pioneer
  - Peter Studebaker (1836–1897), American automobile manufacturer
- Andy Studebaker (born 1985), American football linebacker
- Hugh Studebaker (1900–1978), American actor
- John Ward Studebaker (1887–1989), American education commissioner
- Ted Studebaker (1945–1971), American activist
- Toby Studebaker, US marine jailed for child grooming over the internet
- Studebaker John (born 1952), American blues musician

== See also ==
- Sara Studebaker-Hall (born 1984), American biathlete
- Lexington Studebakers, a minor league baseball team based in Lexington, Kentucky
