= Sceptre (disambiguation) =

A sceptre or scepter is a symbolic staff.

Sceptre or scepter may also refer to:

== Places ==
- Sceptre, Saskatchewan, a village in Canada

== Arts, entertainment, and media ==
=== Music ===
- Scepter Records, a record label
- Sceptre (Indian band), an Indian thrash metal band
- Skepta, UK Recording artist

=== Other uses in arts, entertainment, and media ===
- Scepter of Goth, early multiplayer game
- Sceptre (imprint), an imprint of Hodder & Stoughton
- The Sceptre, a fictional skyscraper in Hitman 3

== Science and technology ==
- Sceptre (fusion reactor), a z-pinch fusion reactor
- AT&T Sceptre, a graphics terminal made by AT&T from 1983 to 1986

== Transportation ==
- Sceptre (yacht), 12-metre class yacht
- HMS Sceptre, the name given to five ships of the Royal Navy
- Humber Sceptre, a British car
- SlipStream Scepter, kit aircraft
- Studebaker Sceptre, a Studebaker prototype car; See List of Studebaker vehicles
- Toyota Camry (XV10), a car known as Toyota Scepter in Japan

== Other uses ==
- Sceptre (horse), a racehorse
- "Scepter", a disc golf fairway driver by Infinite Discs
- Toronto Sceptres, a women's hockey team
