= Rockne (disambiguation) =

Rockne was an American automobile brand produced by the Studebaker Corporation of South Bend, Indiana, from 1932-1933.

Rockne may also refer to:

- Rockne, Texas, an unincorporated community in Bastrop County

== People ==
- Rockne Brubaker (born 1986), American figure skater
- Rockne Krebs (1938–2011), contemporary American artist
- Rockne S. O'Bannon (born 1955), television producer and writer
- Rockne Tarkington (1932–2015), American stage actor
- Anton J. Rockne (1868–1950), American politician
- Knute Rockne (1888–1931), American football player and coach
