= Studebaker E-series truck =

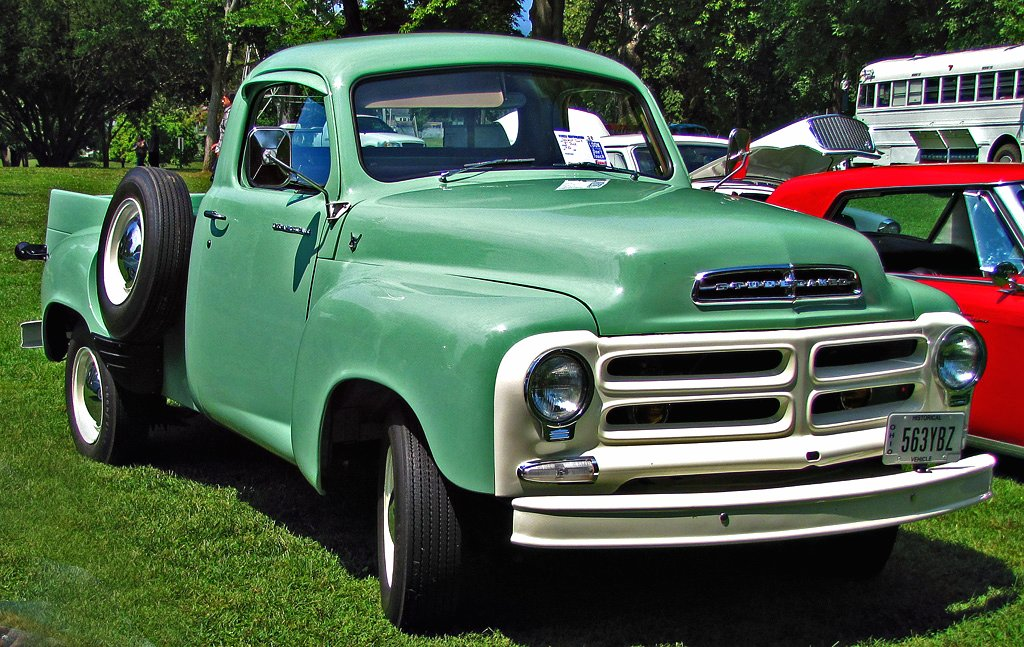
- 1956 Studebaker 2E

Overview
- Manufacturer: Studebaker
- Also called: Studebaker Transtar (1957-1960)
- Production: 1955–1960
- Assembly: Studebaker Automotive Plant, South Bend, Indiana, United States; Studebaker Canada, Hamilton, Ontario, Canada

Body and chassis
- Body style: 2-door pickup
- Layout: Front engine, rear-wheel drive / four-wheel drive

Powertrain
- Engine: 185 cu in (3.0 L) Champion L-head I6; 245.6 cu in (4.0 L) L-head I6; 224 cu in (3.7 L) OHV V8; 259 cu in (4.2 L) OHV V8; 289 cu in (4.7 L) OHV V8; 159 cu in (2.6 L) Detroit Diesel 3-53 two-stroke diesel I3; 212 cu in (3.5 L) Detroit Diesel 4-53 two-stroke diesel I4

Chronology
- Predecessor: Studebaker 2R/3R
- Successor: Studebaker Champ

The E series Studebaker trucks are the original 1955 E series Studebaker trucks, sold in half-ton, 3/4-ton, and 1-, 1.5-, and 2-ton capacities, and the 1956: 2E series; 1957-58: 3E series; 1959: 4E series; 1960: 5E series; 1961: 6E series; 1962: 7E series; and 1963-64: 8E series. Given these model-year designations, "E series" has come to mean all Studebaker trucks built between 1955 and the end of all vehicle production in the US in December 1963. Within each tonnage rating, these trucks were all fairly similar, since Studebaker was in dire financial straits during this entire period and invested virtually nothing to update its truck division products. For the 1956 and 1957-58 models, all Studebaker trucks were called Transtar.

== History ==
The most distinctive characteristic of Studebaker E-series trucks is the cab, which remained unchanged through the 1959 models. With only two changes - a one-piece windshield in 1954 (for the preceding 3R series) and a larger rear window in 1955 for the first E series – it was essentially the same cab as was introduced on the 2R series in mid-1948 as a 1949 model. The first E was available with three engines, the Champion 185 cu in (3.0 L) inline-six with 92 hp (69 kW), the Commander 246 cu in (4.0 L) six with 102 hp (76 kW), or the 224 cu in (3.7 L) Commander V8 with 140 hp (100 kW). The heavier 1½ and 2 ton models were available with the bigger 259 cu in (4.2 L) Commander V8, with 156 or 175 hp (116 or 130 kW) respectively. The bigger engines gradually migrated into the lighter offerings over the years, with the six-cylinder models becoming ever less relevant. In 1957 Studebaker's 289 cu in (4.7 L) V8 engine found its way into the heavy duty 2-ton 3E40 and was sporadically available, mostly at the top of the weight range.

The 1956 2E received a new hood, with the "Studebaker" script now on a secondary chrome grille mounted up high. The front turn signals were also incorporated in the grille, beneath the headlights. 20,218 Studebaker 2E trucks were built in the 1956 model year. A new massive fiberglass grille appeared on the 1957-58 3E models, and was the last significant styling change made to these trucks.

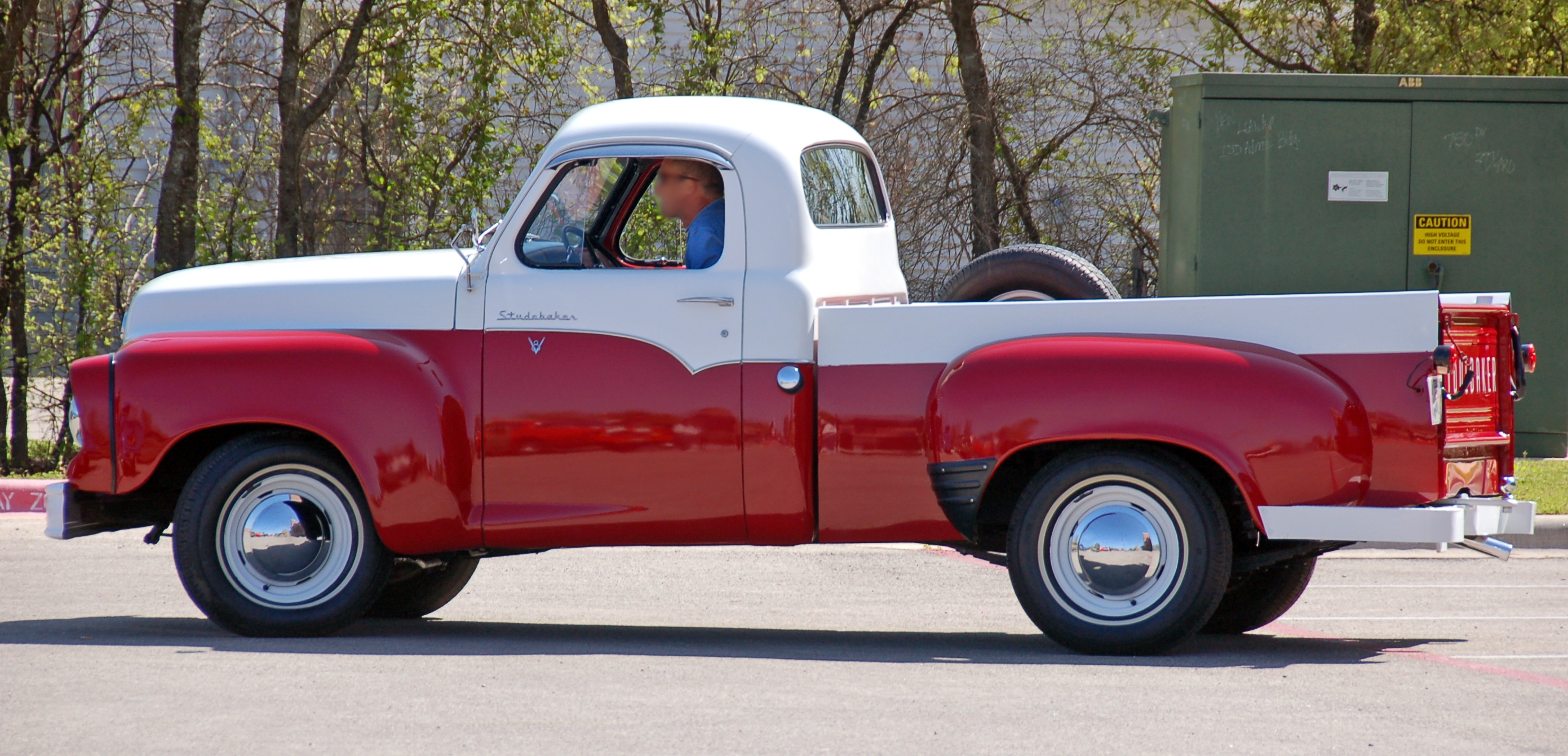
1959 Studebaker 4E Deluxe

For the 1958 and 59 model years, a stripped-down, low-cost Studebaker truck, called the Scotsman, was produced in addition to the Transtars, in 1/2 and 3/4-ton ratings. To save money, it used a modified version of the 1949-53 grille and was spartan in almost every way. For unknown reasons, the Transtar name was dropped from the Studebaker truck line in 1959, though it reappeared in 1960 on the 1-, 1½-, and 2-ton models.

For 1960, E-series trucks received their only major restyling. Called the Champ, the design used the front panels from the 1959–1960 Studebaker Lark passenger car and was available in 1/2-ton and 3/4-ton models.

The 1/2, 3/4, and 1-ton trucks were generally available with both 6-cylinder and V8 engines (no six-cylinder engines were available in the 1-ton trucks after 1960). Larger trucks came with V8s only. Beginning with the 1962 7E models, a 130 hp (97 kW) 212 cu in (3.5 L) Detroit Diesel engine was also available in those of 1-ton or above capacity, and air brakes could be had on 2-ton models. A "96BBC" (meaning 96 inches from bumper to back of cab) was available in both gasoline- and diesel-powered models beginning in 1962. The short cab length was achieved by deleting the fiberglass grille, flattening the front of the hood, and applying a very distinctive flat nose below the hood. This model was produced in response to some state laws that restricted the overall length of tractor trailers, and thus permitted the use of longer trailers. In the last two model years a 97 hp (72 kW) 159 cu in (2.6 L) three-cylinder Detroit Diesel 3D-53 engine was offered in 1 and 1½-ton configurations (8E15 and 8E25). Production of diesel-engined models was very low, although they continued to be available until the end in 1964.

Four-wheel drive was available on 1/2 and 3/4-ton models beginning in 1957. Studebaker did not make the 4WD equipment themselves, but (in common with Chevrolet and GMC at the time) purchased the hardware from NAPCO (Northwestern Auto Parts Company).
