= Studebaker Transtar =

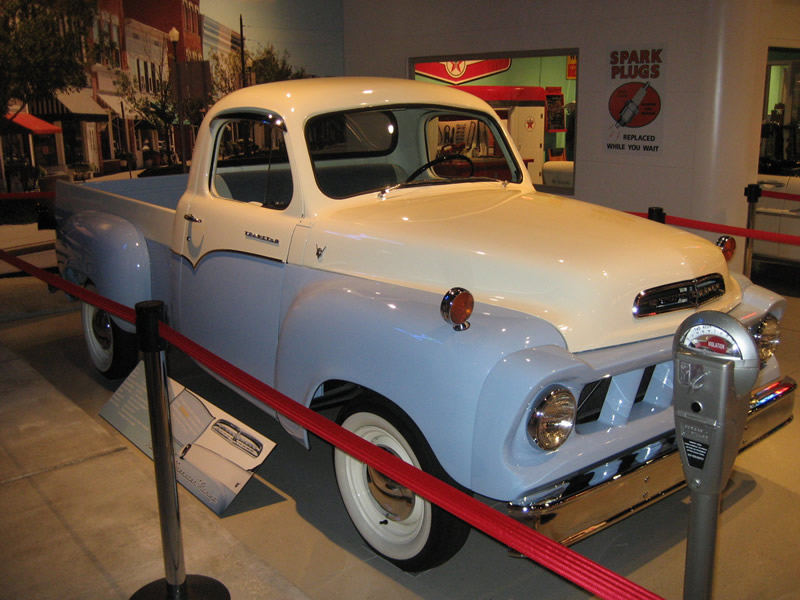
- Studebaker Transtar Truck Model 3-E

Overview
- Manufacturer: Studebaker
- Production: 1957–1960
- Assembly: Studebaker Automotive Plant, South Bend, Indiana, United States; Studebaker Canada, Hamilton, Ontario, Canada

Body and chassis
- Body style: 2-door pickup
- Layout: Front engine, rear-wheel drive / four-wheel drive

Powertrain
- Engine: 185 cu in (3.0 L) Champion I6; 246 cu in (4.0 L) I6; 224 cu in (3.7 L) V8; 259 cu in (4.2 L) V8; 289 cu in (4.7 L) V8

Chronology
- Successor: Studebaker Champ

Transtar was the model name given to the line of trucks produced by the Studebaker Corporation of South Bend, Indiana, from 1956-1958 and 1960-1963 (although the last vehicles were sold as 1964 models). The name was used on most trucks in the Studebaker E-series, but not all. The Transtar name was first introduced for the 1956 (2E series) model year in 1/2-ton, 3/4-ton, 1-ton, 2-ton, and 2-ton heavy duty capacities. The three smaller models were available with factory-built pick-up bodies. The basic styling of these trucks dated back to the 1949 models, though they had received some styling and engineering changes in 1954 and 55. The Transtar name continued to be used on most of the 1957-58 3E series trucks, though a stripped-down Studebaker Scotsman model without the Transtar name was introduced in the 1958 model year. The 57-58 Transtars received an aggressive new fiberglass grille that attempted (largely successfully) to make Studebaker's outdated cab design look fresh and new. For unknown reasons, the Transtar name was dropped for the 1959 4E series Studebaker trucks and changed to Deluxe.

For 1960, Studebaker introduced a new line of 1/2-ton and 3/4-ton trucks under the name Studebaker Champ. The Champs used front-end and cab sheetmetal from the 1959-60 Lark passenger cars, mated to their existing light-duty truck chassis and drive trains. The Champs were created in response to the Ford Ranchero (introduced in 1957) and Chevrolet El Camino (introduced in 1959), which used passenger car styling and features in a light-duty pickup truck. The Transtar name reappeared on Studebaker's medium- and heavy-duty trucks (1- and 2-ton) for 1960, and continued to be used on these trucks up through its 1964 models. Studebaker suspended production of all of its truck models when it closed its United States factory in December 1963.
