= Studebaker 2R/3R =

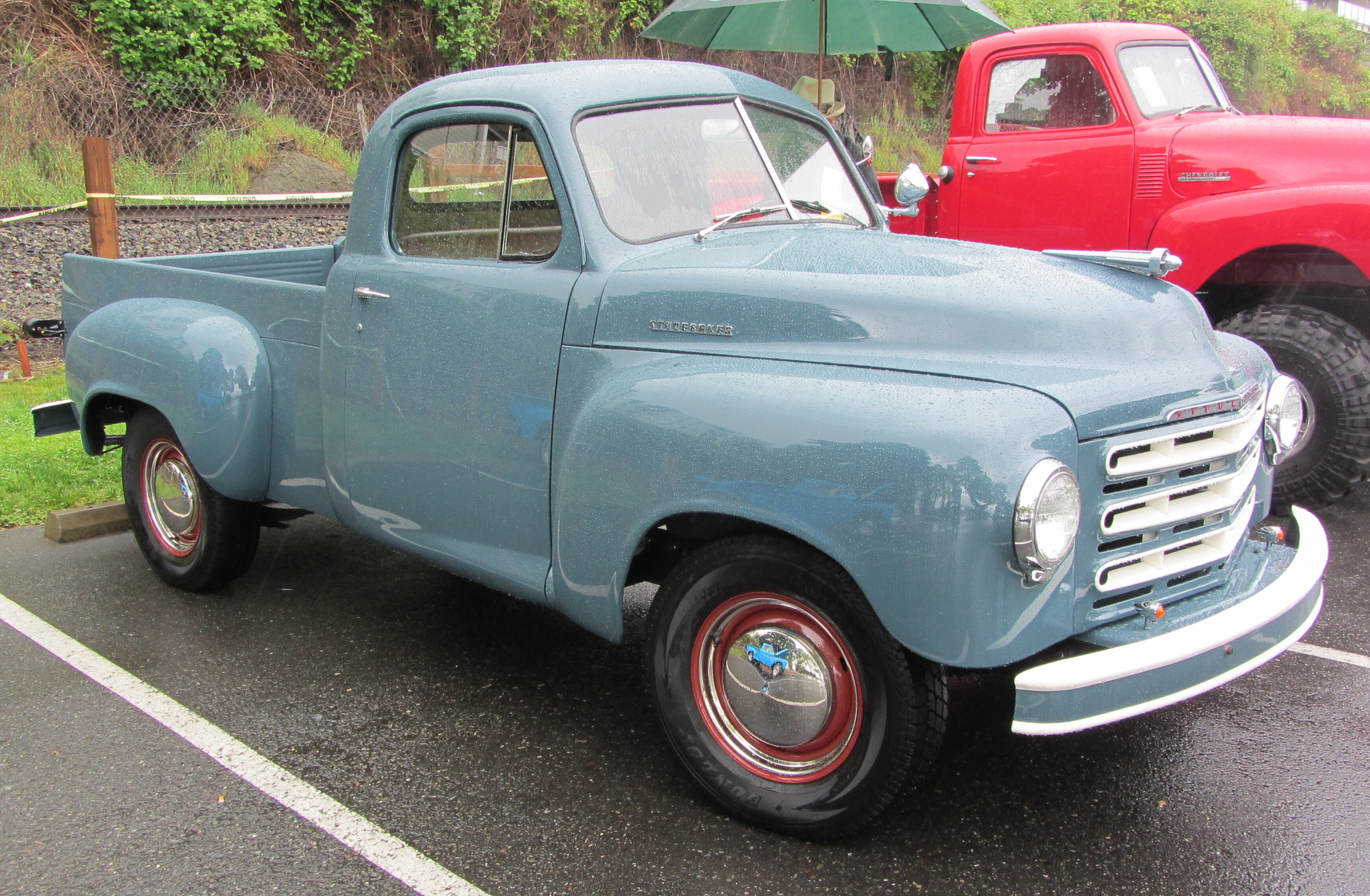
- Light-duty Studebaker 2R

Overview
- Manufacturer: Studebaker
- Production: 1948–1954
- Assembly: Studebaker Automotive Plant, South Bend, Indiana, United States; Studebaker Canada, Hamilton, Ontario, Canada
- Designer: Robert Bourke

Body and chassis
- Body style: 2-door pickup
- Layout: Front engine, rear-wheel drive Front engine, four-wheel drive (3R48 only)

Powertrain
- Engine: 169.6 cu in (2.8 L) Econ-O-Miser L-head I6; 226.0 cu in (3.7 L) Power-Plus L-head I6; 245.6 cu in (4.0 L) Power-Plus L-head I6; 232.6 cu in (3.8 L) Commander OHV V8
- Transmission: 3/4-speed Borg-Warner manual

Dimensions
- Wheelbase: 112–195 in (2,840–4,950 mm)

Chronology
- Predecessor: Studebaker M-series
- Successor: Studebaker E-series

The Studebaker 2R is a series of light- and medium-duty trucks built by the Studebaker Corporation from April 1948 until the end of 1953. For the 1954 model year, after a light redesign, the line was renamed 3R and built for an additional eight months. Studebaker had worked on a still born post-war design earlier, called the R, and so the new truck was given the 2R designation. The most distinctive characteristic of Studebaker 2R/3R trucks is the cab, which remained in production with minor changes through the 1959 model year. A one-piece windshield arrived in February 1954 (becoming the 3R series) and a larger rear window arrived in 1955 for the succeeding E-series.

== 2R ==
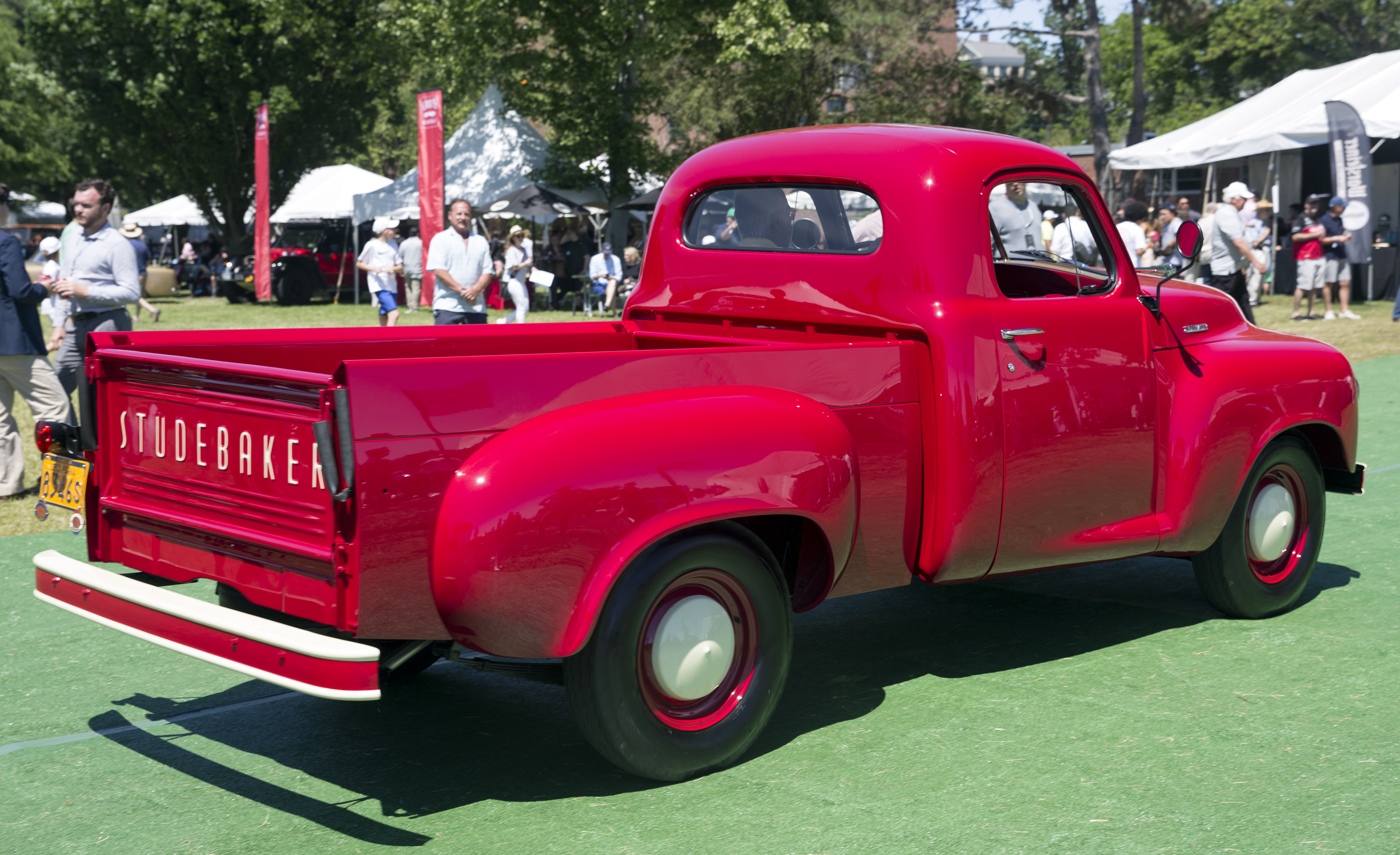
Rear view (1953 Studebaker 2R5)

The range was offered in half-ton, 3/4-ton, and 1-, 1.5-, and 2-ton capacities. They were called 2R5, 2R10, 2R15, 2R16, and 2R17 respectively. The model numbers were carried over for the 1954, becoming 3R5, 3R10, and so on. Called the "model C cab" internally, this design continued to be used on the succeeding E-series trucks. The modern looking design was lower than the competitors, had comparably large glass areas, and did away with running boards. It also introduced a number of new features to the light truck segment, such as the use of a double-walled bed which protects the outer sheetmetal from damage from loads, a gas tank mounted outside of the cab, and variable rate steering. The design was executed in Studebaker's in-house studio by Robert Bourke under the direction of Virgil Exner. The designer also claimed that this was the first instance of having the brand name stamped across the tailgate in large letters. Production ended in December 1953, with 266,662 of the 2R-series trucks built in total.

=== Drivetrain ===
The 2R was available with two L-head inline-six engines, the Econ-O-Miser 169.6 cu in (2.8 L) with 80 hp (60 kW) or the larger Power-Plus 226 cu in (3.7 L) with 94 hp (70 kW) in the heavier 1½- and 2-ton 2R16 and 2R17 models. The Power-Plus engine used in trucks built after the end of calendar year 1948 was updated to the longer stroke, 245.6 cu in (4.0 L) version with 102 hp (76 kW). These models are called 2R16A and 2R17A respectively.

The three lighter models originally only received the Econ-O-Miser engine; in May 1949 the Power-Plus became optionally available on the lightest models as well (2R6), originally only for export and in small numbers. In March and April 1950 the more powerful ¾- and 1-ton 2R11 and 2R14 models entered production for export, becoming regularly available in the domestic market for model year 1951. For 1951 the Econ-O-Miser engine also received a higher 7.0 to 1 compression ratio (rather than the earlier 6.5), increasing power to 85 hp (63 kW). The lighter two models have a three-speed, column-shifted manual transmission by Warner Gear, usually coupled to Dana rear axles. The heavier trucks were fitted with four-speed 'boxes. In 1950, Studebaker offered another first when they introduced overdrive as an option on the two lightest models. Also in 1950, the lever arm shock absorbers were changed for more modern telescopic shocks.

In addition to the regularly available range, Studebaker did also offer a V8-engined version of the 1.5-ton truck but it was never sold in North America. Just over 2,000 were built from 1951 until 1953, all CKD for export. The 2R28 was mainly built in right-hand-drive, with the Indian Army being a prime purchaser. These trucks received the then-new 232.6 cu in (3.8 L), 120 hp (89 kW) OHV V8 as also used in Studebaker's passenger cars.

Model Codes

Engine Model	Econ-O-Miser I6 169.6 cu in (2.8 L)	Power-Plus I6 245.6 cu in (4.0 L)	Commander V8 232.6 cu in (3.8 L)
1/2-ton	2R5 (1948–1953)	2R6 (1949–1953)	—
3/4-ton	2R10 (1948–1953)	2R11 (1950–1953)	—
1-ton	2R15 (1948–1953)	2R14 (1950–1953)	—
1½-ton	—	2R16 (1948) (Note: The Power-Plus engine installed in trucks built in calendar year 1948 was the earlier, 226-cu in version.); 2R16A (1949–1953)	2R28 (1951–1953) (Note: CKD export only.)
2-ton	—	2R17 (1948); 2R17A (1949–1953)	—

== 3R ==
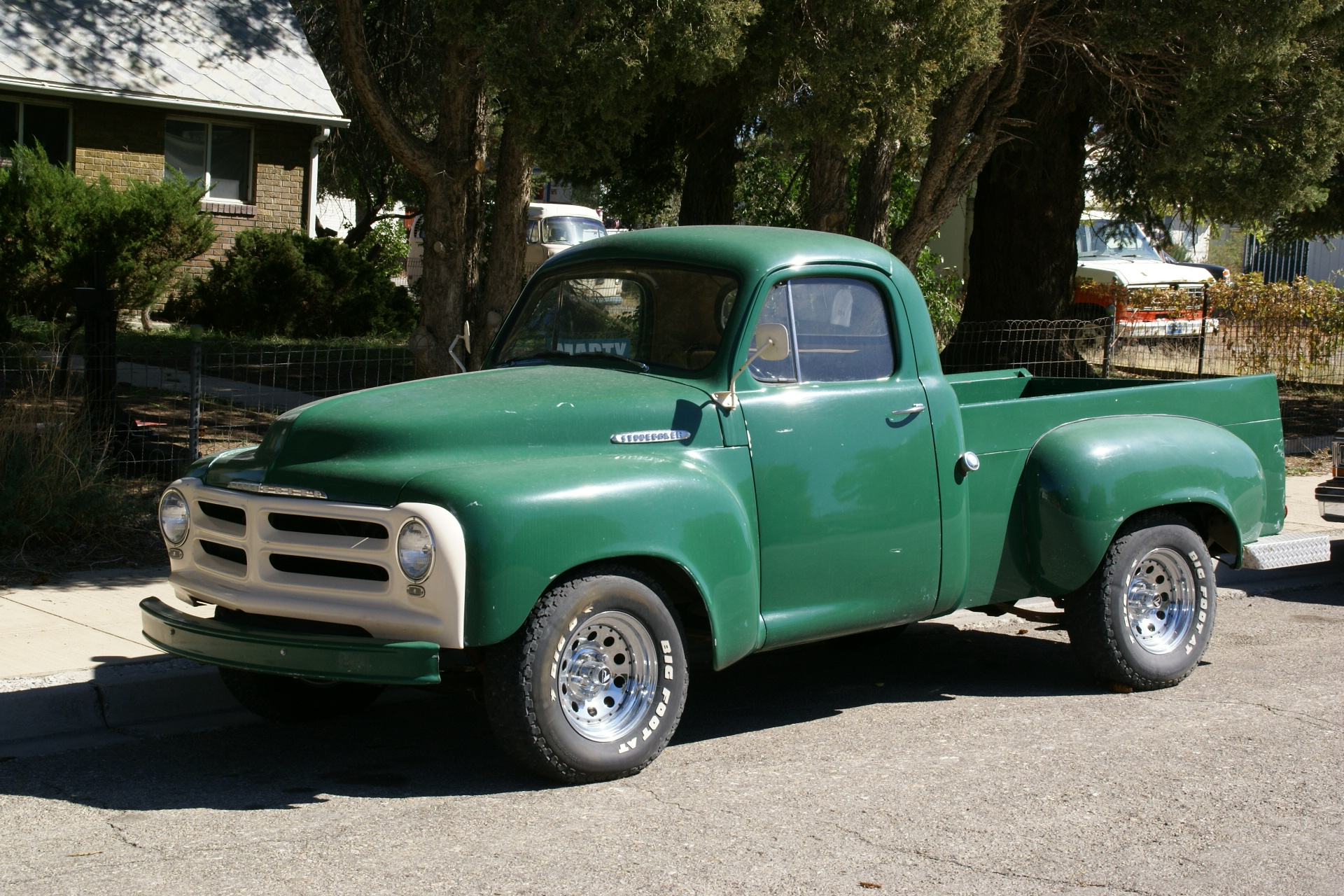
1954 Studebaker 3R, with a new full-width grille and single windshield

Sales stagnated considerably over the life of the 2R, dropping by two-thirds from 1949 until 1953. Studebaker's limited budget and lack of interest in their truck lineup had starved the line of updates. For 1954, however, Studebaker gave the truck a light redesign, consisting of a new full-width ivory-colored grille with integrated headlights and parking lights, new dashboard, and a single-piece windshield. Now known as the 3R, the redesign was not even able to maintain the sales numbers, however. After a late introduction in February 1954, production dropped by more than half (to 10,418 when CKD trucks are included); only 4,160 of the 3R series trucks were delivered in the United States. The 3R was only manufactured from January to August 1954.

The 3R lineup was mostly identical to the 2R, although a significant addition was the availability of a V8 engine to American customers as well. Only available in the two heaviest models, coded 3R28 and 3R38 respectively, they have the same 232.6 cu in (3.8 L) overhead valve V8 engine as used in the 2R28, albeit now producing 127 hp (95 kW). An interesting hybrid is the 3R48 – built after 3R production had come to an end, from September to December 1954, these are right-hand drive, four-wheel drive, 3-ton, cab and chassis trucks made exclusively for the Indian Army. Their bodywork and interior are actually from the 2R, presumably because that is what the Indian Government procurement contract had described.
