= French ship Sceptre =

Six ships of the French Navy have borne the name Sceptre after the sceptre, a symbol of royal or imperial authority.

- French ship Sceptre (1670), an 80-gun (later 84-gun) ship of the line
- French ship Sceptre (1691), an 84-gun ship of the line, lead ship of her class
- French ship Sceptre (1720), a 74-gun ship of the line, never commissioned
- French ship Sceptre (1747), a Monarque-class 74-gun ship of the line
- French ship Sceptre (1780), a 74-gun ship of the line
- French ship Sceptre (1810), a Bucentaure-class 80-gun ship of the line

== See also ==
- HMS Sceptre
