= Albert Russel Erskine =

American businessman (1871–1933)

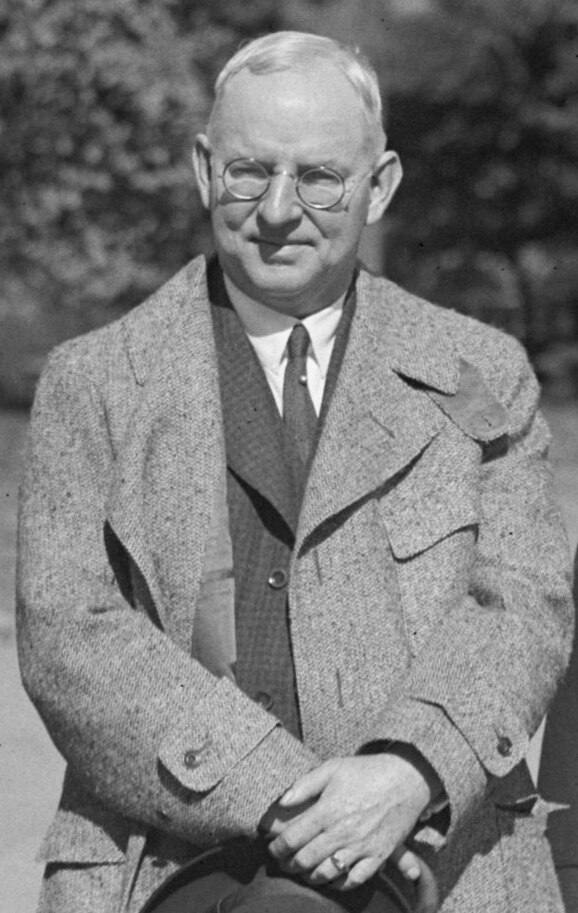
- Erskine in 1923
- Born: January 24, 1871; Huntsville, Alabama, U.S.
- Died: July 1, 1933 (aged 62); South Bend, Indiana, U.S.
- Resting place: Maple Hill Cemetery; Huntsville, Alabama, U.S.
- Occupation: Automotive executive
- Known for: president of Studebaker
- Spouse: Annie Leyll Garland (m. 1903)
- Children: 1

Albert Russel Erskine (January 24, 1871 – July 1, 1933) was an American businessman. Born in Huntsville, Alabama, he worked in a number of manufacturing industries before joining the Studebaker motor car manufacturing firm in 1911. He served as Studebaker's president from 1915 until the firm encountered severe financial problems in 1933, when he committed suicide.

== Early life and career ==
Albert Russel Erskine was born on January 24, 1871, in Huntsville, Alabama, to William Michael Erskine. He was educated in public and private schools. As a boy, he sold apples to train passengers passing through the Huntsville station.

Erskine started work as a bookkeeper for US$65 a month. He was chief clerk at the American Cotton Company in St. Louis, Missouri, and New York. From 1904 to 1910, he was treasurer of Yale & Towne Manufacturing Company. From 1910 to 1911, he served as vice president of Underwood Typewriter Company.

== Career with Studebaker ==
Erskine joined Studebaker in 1911 as treasurer and a member of the executive committee. He became vice president of Studebaker in 1913 and later became president.

During his long term as Studebaker's president, he encouraged the firm towards the production of small, sporty but economical cars on the European model, in particular the Erskine and Rockne series. He also published a history of the firm, in 1918. He oversaw wartime operations of Studebaker during World War I and its manufacturing of war equipment. Following the war, he led a US$50,000,000 expansion of Studebaker and consolidated its production and assembly operations in South Bend, Indiana. In the summer of 1928, he led Studebaker's acquisition of Pierce-Arrow Motor Car Company of Buffalo, New York, and reorganized Pierce-Arrow's operations and served as its president and chairman of the board.

== Downfall and death ==
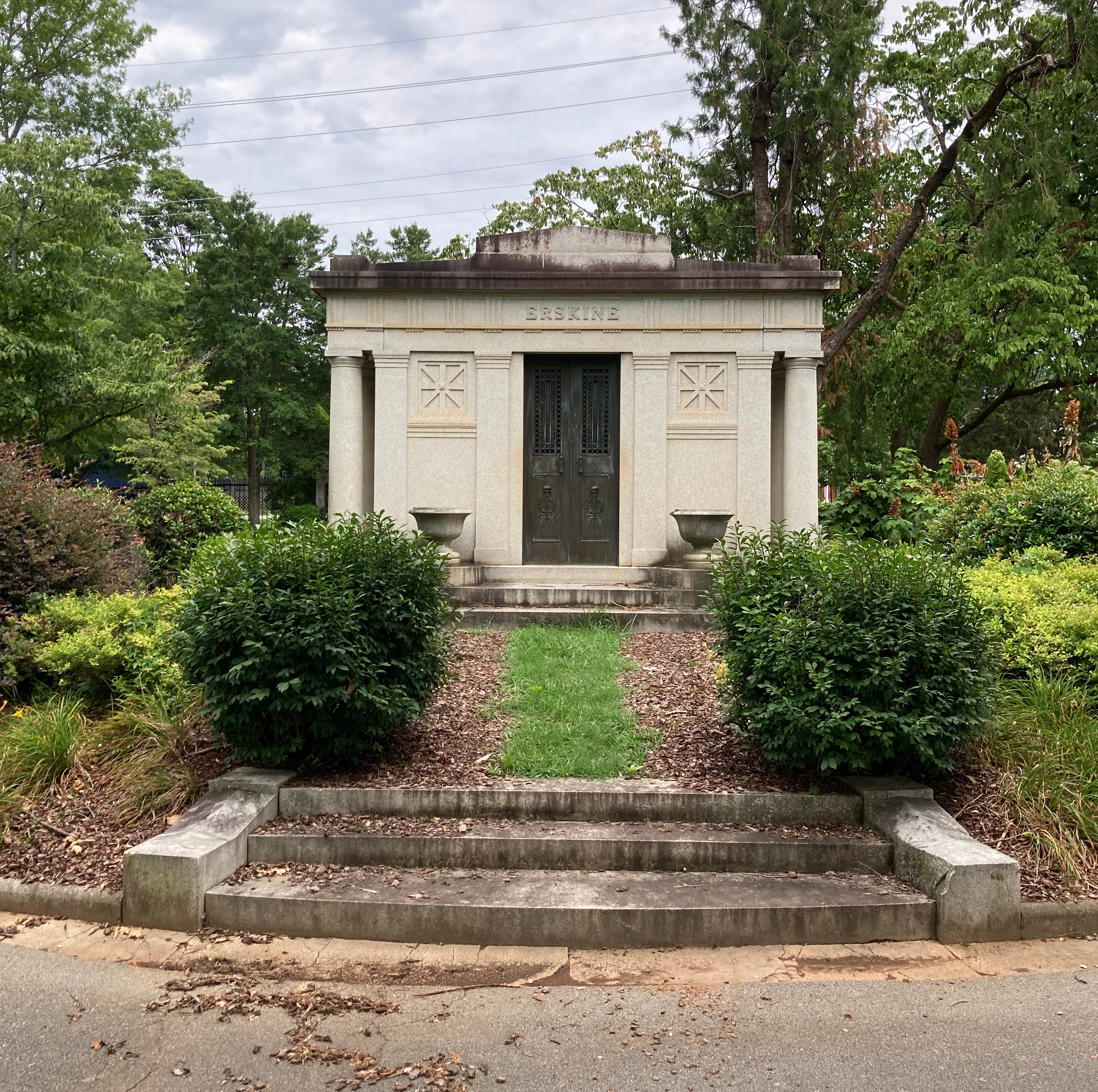
Erskine mausoleum at Maple Hill Cemetery

His downfall lay in his failure to cut production and costs quickly in response to the slump of 1929 and 1930, which led to an insurmountable cashflow crisis. In 1930, he had declared a dividend of $7,800,000 which was five times the actual net profits of that year. In 1931, he paid a dividend of $3,500,000—also out of capital—a ruinous procedure which he unsuccessfully sought to correct through a merger with White Motor Company. Working capital had fallen from $26 million in 1926 to $3.5 million in 1932 and the banks were owed $6 million, for which they demanded payment. Studebaker defaulted and went into receivership.

Suffering from heart trouble and diabetes, ousted from his position at Studebaker, himself $350,000 in debt and his Studebaker stock now all but worthless, Erskine committed suicide on June 30, 1933, by shooting himself in the heart in his home on the south side of South Bend. He is interred at the Erksine Mausoleum in Maple Hill Cemetery in Huntsville. Hendry added, "According to one account, the insurance companies duly and promptly paid all his debts and provided for his dependents".

== Personal life ==
Erskine married Annie Leyll Garland of Huntington, West Virginia, in 1903. He had a son, Albert Russel Jr. He lived at his Twyckenham estate and helped develop the neighboring Ridgedale development.

== Philanthropy and other interests ==
Erskine served as director of the South Bend War Chest from 1917 to 1919. In 1920, he helped organize the Citizens' Home organization, a subsidiary of Studebaker that invested almost US$3,000,000 into home development in South Bend. From 1922 to 1926, he was a member of the city planning committee.

Erskine was a member of the Intrastate Harbors Commission of Illinois and Indiana. He was a director of Chicago's Federal Reserve Board. He was a director of the National Automobile Chamber of Commerce. He was an avid golfer. He was donor and served as the director and president of the South Bend Country Club. He was a member of the board of directors of Marine Trust Company of Buffalo.

=== Erskine Park ===
Erskine developed a 120 acres (49 ha) park and golf course in South Bend that became known as Erskine Park.

=== University of Notre Dame ===
In addition to his business work, Erskine served on the board of trustees of the University of Notre Dame, where his son Albert Jr. studied. The university awarded him an honorary LL.D. in 1924. He took a strong interest in college football (a later Studebaker brand, the Rockne, was named after Notre Dame's football coach of the time), and initiated the Albert Russel Erskine Trophy for the national football championship. The winner was chosen by a panel whose methods are, in essence, still used to select the champion team. He was instrumental in a grant of $10,000 that the Studebaker Corporation made to Harvard University in 1926, to set up the Albert Russel Erskine Bureau for Street Traffic Research, which remained active through much of the 1930s.

== Legacy ==
A hotel in Huntsville was named after Erskine.
