= Erskine (automobile) =

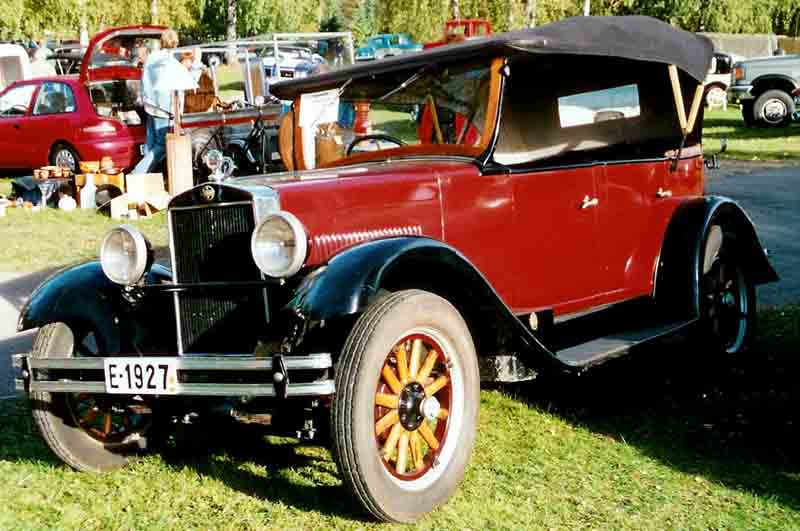
- Erskine Model 50 Touring 1927

Overview
- Manufacturer: Studebaker
- Model code: 50; 51; 52; 53
- Production: 1926–1930
- Model years: 1927–1930
- Assembly: United States: South Bend, Indiana
- Designer: Ray Dietrich

Powertrain
- Engine: 146–205 cu in (2–3 L)

Dimensions
- Wheelbase: 108–114 in (2,743–2,896 mm)

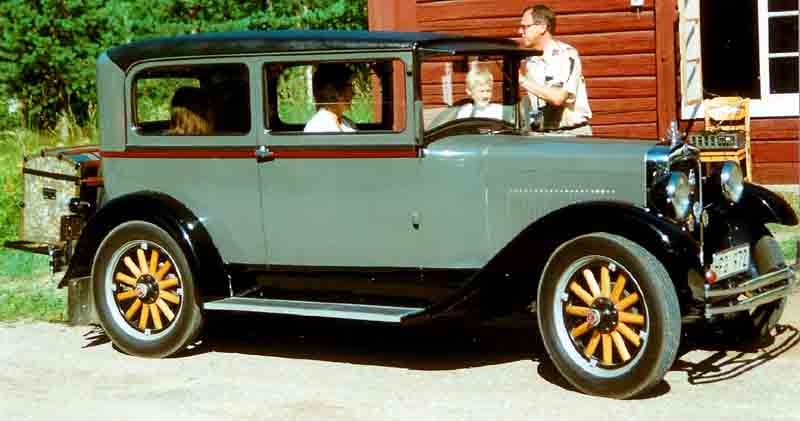
Erskine Model 51 Sedan 1928

The Erskine was an American automobile brand produced by the Studebaker Corporation of South Bend, Indiana, United States, from 1926 to 1930. The marque was named after Albert Russel Erskine (1871–1933), Studebaker's president at the time.

During his term as president, Erskine encouraged Studebaker engineers to develop advanced engines. As a result, the company achieved numerous racing wins and a bigger share of the upper-price market. This left Studebaker without an entry-level automobile in the United States, and Erskine, who had always been fascinated by smaller European vehicles, saw market potential in a short-wheelbase compact car, especially if it could expand Studebaker's presence in the European market. The Erskine Six was therefore first launched in Paris.

When introduced in time for the American 1927 model year, the car was named after its creator, and marketed as The Little Aristocrat. To make the Erskine affordable, Studebaker fitted the cars with six-cylinder Continental engines rather than the more advanced Studebaker units and priced the cars at $995. Body design was by Ray Dietrich; the design proved to be quite a head-turner, and received numerous accolades from the British and French press. Initially, sales demand was promising. However, within a year Ford introduced its Model A and priced it at $525, undercutting the Erskine by $470.

To remedy this, Studebaker marketing suggested that the Erskine become a larger car which, when implemented, grew the wheelbase from 108 in (2,743 mm) to 114 in (2,896 mm). The Erskine was no longer small, and became more like its Studebaker brethren. Ultimately, the Erskine was absorbed into Studebaker by May 1930. A little over a year later, Studebaker would try again with the 1931 Rockne brand automobile.

To his credit, Albert Russel Erskine successfully strengthened Studebaker's core automobile business and helped to guide the corporation toward technical advancements that eventually would help the company through the first few years of the depression.

However, Erskine also encouraged the payment of stockholder dividends from Studebaker's capital reserves as the depression deepened; this inflated the value of the stock, and eventually weakened the company. In addition to the two failed marques he created (Rockne and Erskine), Erskine also had purchased luxury car maker Pierce-Arrow during the high-rolling 1920s, which had to be sold off to investors as a means of improving cash flow.

Faced with loss of control of Studebaker, Albert Russel Erskine committed suicide in 1933 at his home in South Bend, Indiana.

== Production totals (model year) for Erskine ==
- 1927, 24,893 units
- 1928, 22,275 units
- 1929, 25,565 units
- 1930, 22,371 units

== Online resources ==
- From Horses to Horsepower, Studebaker Moves a Nation, Smithsonian Institution
