= Studebaker Building =

Studebaker Building may refer to:

- Studebaker Building (St. Petersburg, Florida)
- Fine Arts Building (Chicago), formerly known as the Studebaker Building
- Studebaker Building (midtown Manhattan), in midtown Manhattan
- Studebaker Building (Columbia University), in the Manhattanville section of Manhattan
- Studebaker Building (Brooklyn) a designated New York City landmark in Crown Heights, Brooklyn
