= Studebaker Conestoga =

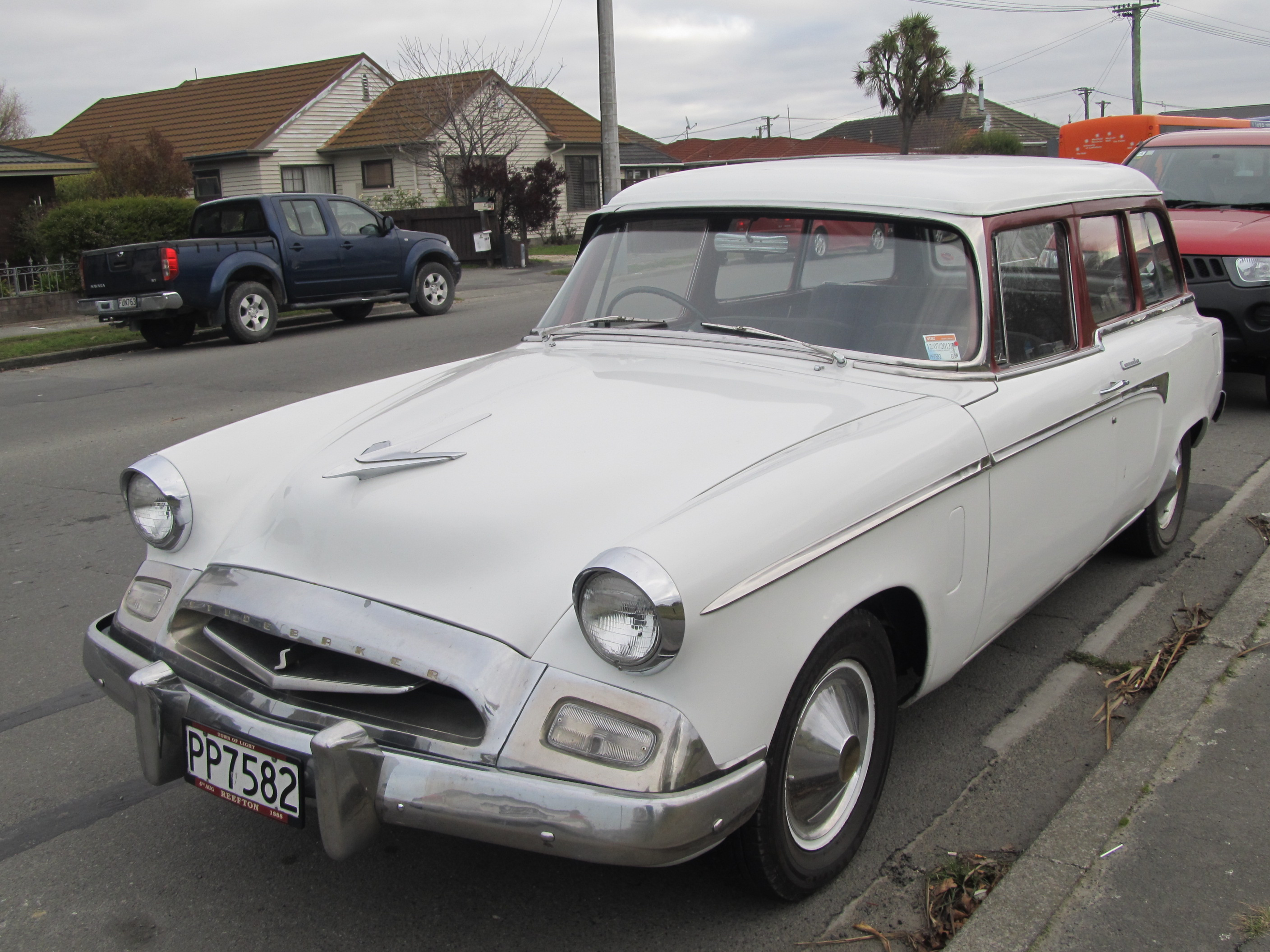
- 1955 Conestoga

Overview
- Manufacturer: Studebaker
- Production: 1954–1955

Body and chassis
- Body style: Two-door wagon

Dimensions
- Wheelbase: 116.5 in (2,960 mm)

The Studebaker Conestoga is an all-steel station wagon that was produced in 1954 and 1955 by the Studebaker Corporation of South Bend, Indiana (USA). The company chose the name Conestoga as an homage to its wagon business that company produced from the 1850s into the early 20th century.

== Station wagon ==
The Conestoga station wagons were built on the Studebaker's 116.5 in (2,960 mm) wheelbase platform. One body style was available, a two-door wagon with a two-piece tailgate/liftgate configuration for accessing the cargo area.

The 1954 Conestoga's original base price was $2,095, and 3,074 were produced.

== Ambulance ==
The Conestoga was also available in an ambulance version that Studebaker called the Ambulet. This model included a stretcher, red cross decals, and other ambulance features. The Ambulet was promoted primarily for police and fire departments as well as for small-town funeral homes, many of which provided ambulance services at the time.

== Lark compact ==
Studebaker discontinued the Conestoga nameplate at the end of the 1955 model year, although the basic body would be continued through several styling changes — and even built as a Lark compact — through 1961.

== Gallery ==
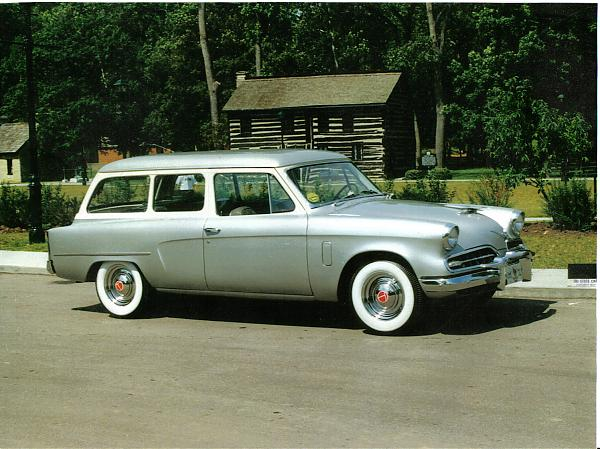
1954 Conestoga Custom

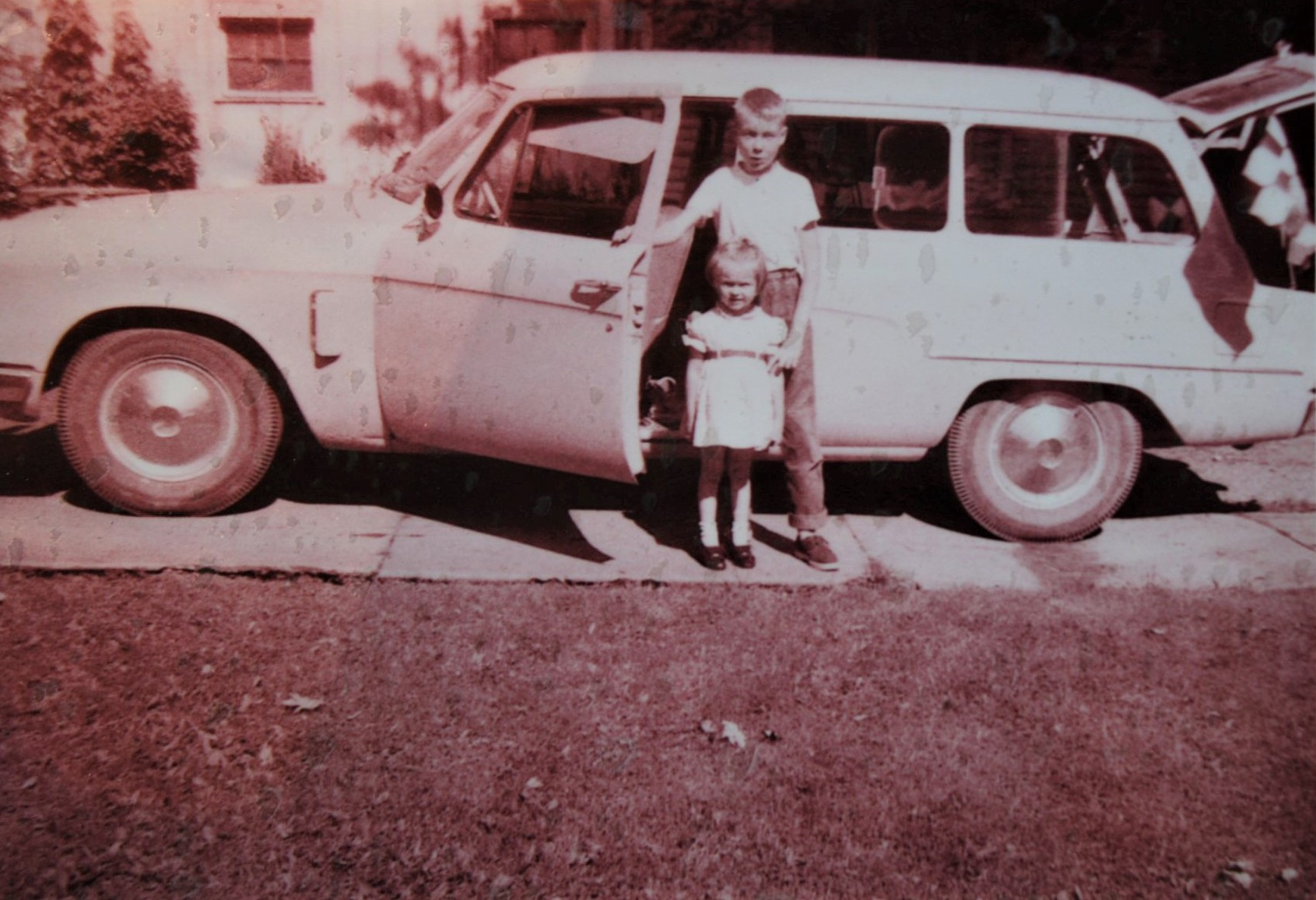
Vintage 1954 Studebaker

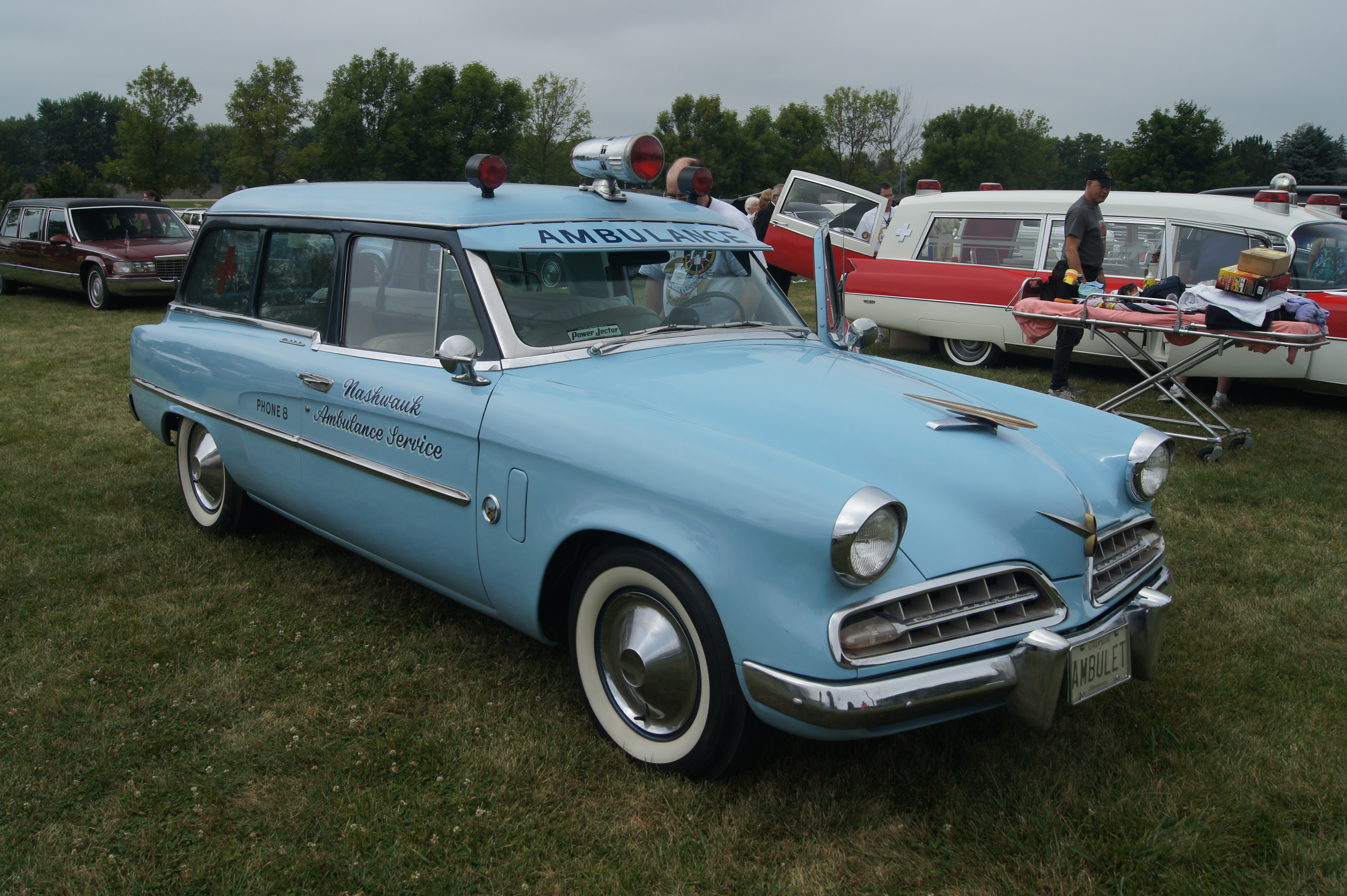
1954 Ambulet front

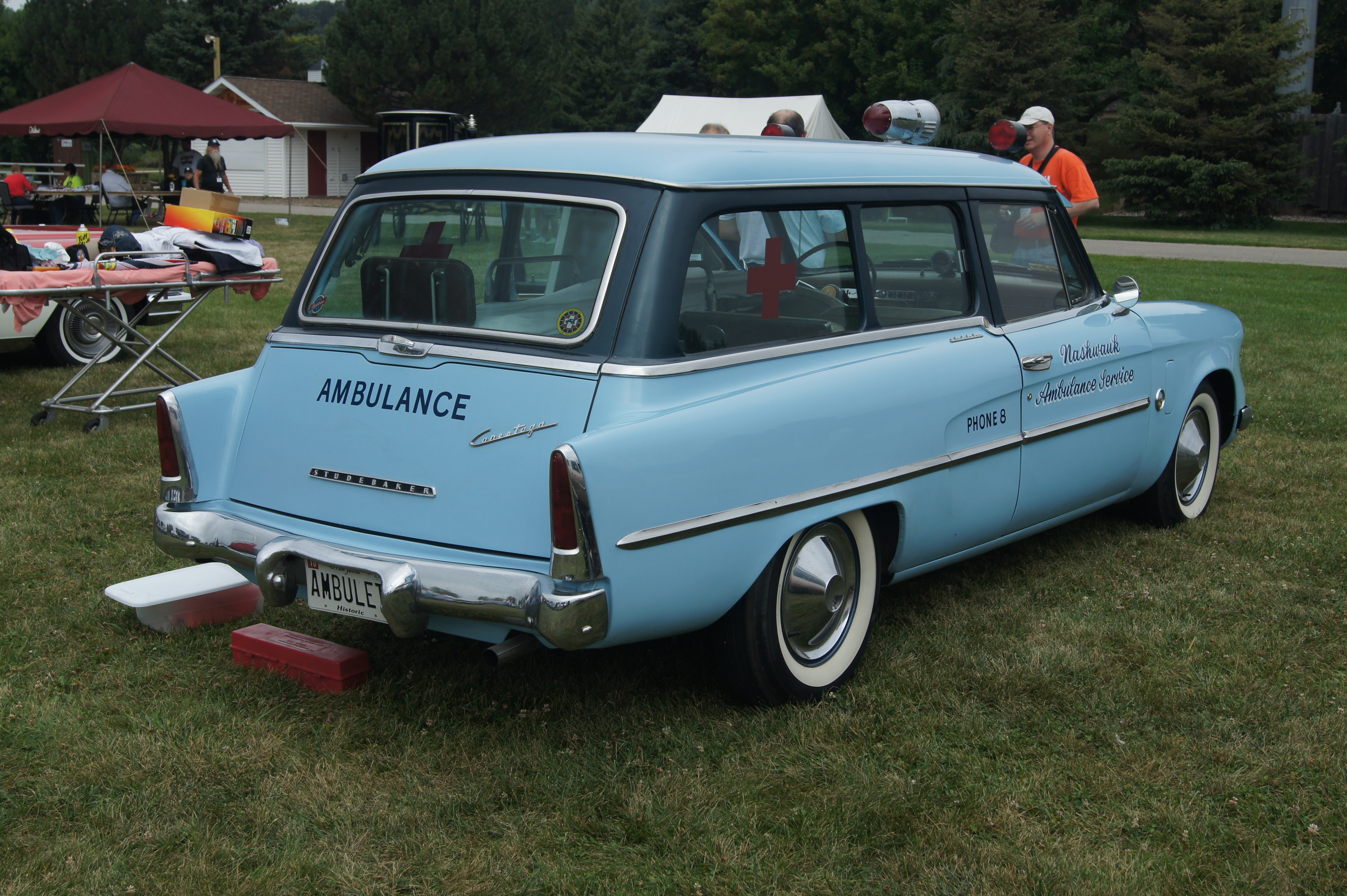
1954 Ambulet rear

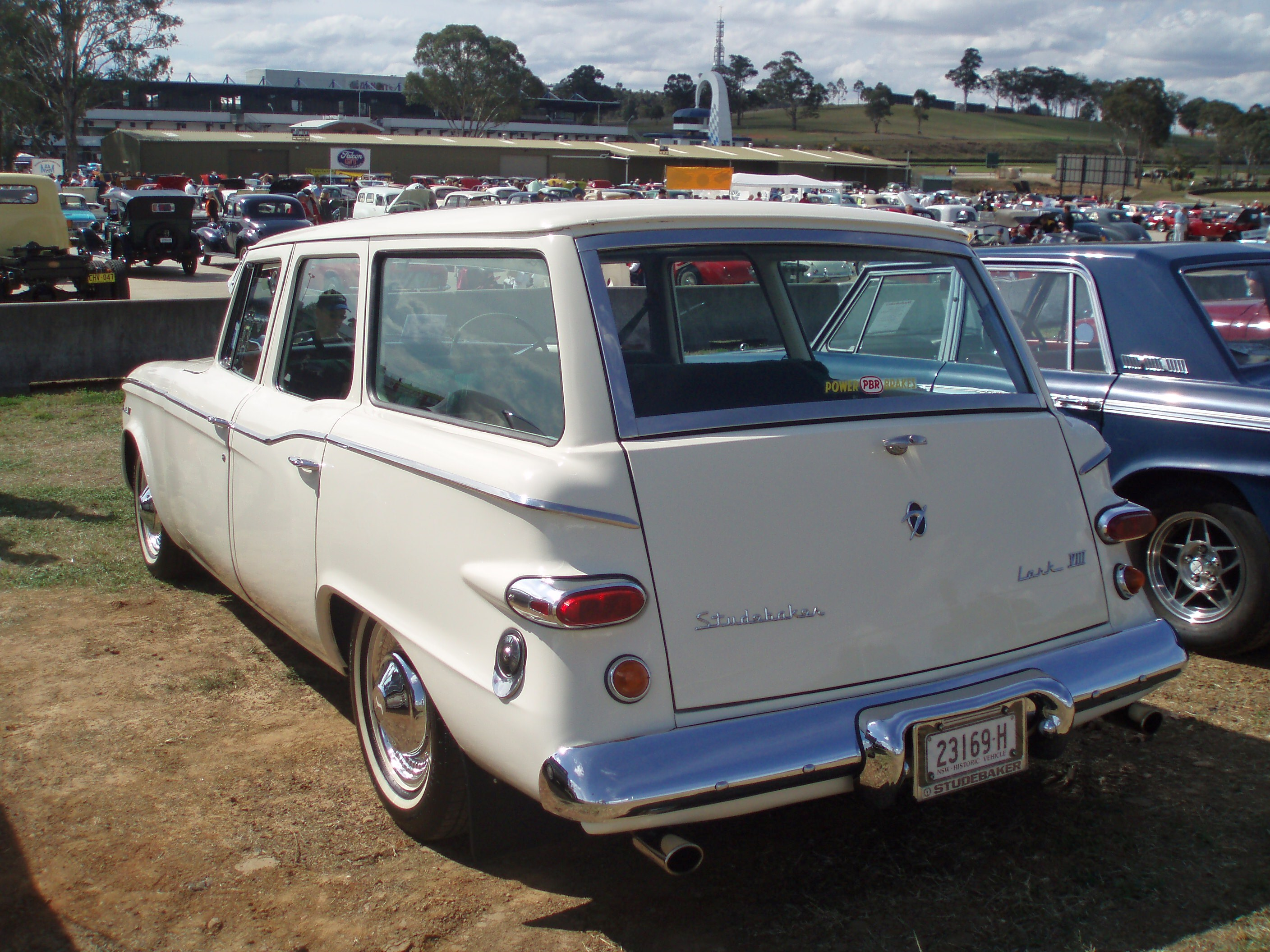
1961 Lark wagon
