= Studebaker Champ =

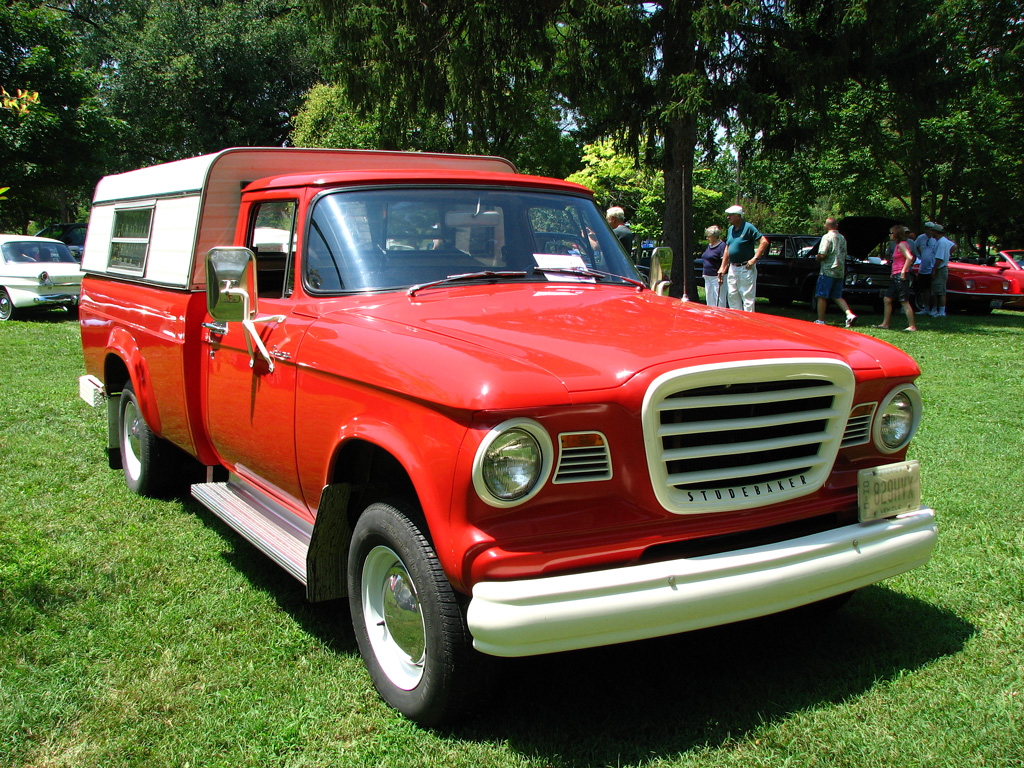
- 1962 Studebaker Champ Pickup

Overview
- Manufacturer: Studebaker
- Production: 1960–1964
- Assembly: Studebaker Automotive Plant, South Bend, Indiana, United States; Studebaker Canada, Hamilton, Ontario, Canada; Studebaker Australia, Melbourne, Victoria, Australia, Israel

Body and chassis
- Body style: 2-door pickup truck
- Layout: FR layout
- Related: Studebaker Lark

Powertrain
- Engine: 170 cu in (2.8 L) sv I6; 170 cu in (2.8 L) OHV I6; 245 cu in (4.0 L) Big Six sv I6; 259 cu in (4.2 L) OHV V8; 289 cu in (4.7 L) OHV V8

Chronology
- Predecessor: Studebaker E-Series

The Studebaker Champ is a light-duty pickup truck produced by the Studebaker Corporation from 1960-1964, the last such vehicles designed by the company before leaving the automobile manufacturing business in 1966.

Designed at a time when Studebaker's truck line had not seen major upgrading in over 10 years, Studebaker engineers were forced to use a number of existing components to fit within the $900,000 budget given them by the company's Board of Directors, but the end result was astonishingly fresh and competitive in price, capability and performance with other American-built trucks of the era.

The Champ, unlike most American pickups of the 1960s, was never offered with power steering, although such a system was offered on Studebaker's heavier-duty Studebaker Transtar and Diesels. The final "8E" (1963–64) models had an improved steering system that reduced friction and, thus, steering effort, but not to the degree that power steering would have. Of course, power steering was not yet commonplace in light trucks during the early 1960s, so Studebaker was not necessarily at a competitive disadvantage by not offering the option. From 1960 through 1964, Studebaker offered a sliding back window in the Champ pickup. This utilized the same opening as the single pane rear window, but used a double sliding channel and two panes of glass. One window could be opened until it was flush with the other. This helped with ventilation and access to the front of the cargo bed without leaving the cab of the truck.

== Chassis and body details ==
The chassis of the Champ was basically the same as what had been used for Studebaker's ½ and ¾-ton E-series trucks since 1949, a typical ladder frame with solid axles both front and rear. Despite its age, the Champ's chassis components were no more or less modern than those found in GM, Ford, Chrysler or International Harvester trucks, all of which also still used solid axle suspensions.

Atop this carryover frame, the cab section was very different. While an entirely new cab was out of the question because of cost considerations, the new Lark compact car's body proved to be just the right size and shape to suit the purpose. The engineering staff took a Lark four-door sedan, cut it in half behind the front doors and modified the front half slightly to fit the mounting points on the truck chassis. The only new sheetmetal stamping that was required was the back wall of the new cab. Funds were allocated to give the Champ a new horizontal-bar grille that delivered a "tougher" look than the Lark's mesh.

== Cargo boxes ==
For the first two model years (1960-61), Champs would also carry over the 1949-vintage cargo box, which had been widened slightly for 1956. The wide cargo box, introduced in early calendar 1961, was from the Dodge C-Series, and was made available after a deal between Studebaker and Dodge. Both cargo boxes were available in short (112" wheelbase) and long (122" wheelbase) versions.

The original, narrow box, codenamed "P1" by Studebaker, went out of production in late 1961. The wide "P2" box was the only option available thereafter.

== Power ==
Studebaker equipped the Champ with engines that had served well in the company's lineup for years. Buyers in 1960 could choose the last of the company's flathead sixes, either the Lark's 170 cuin (90 hp (67 kW)) or the time-honored 245 cuin "Big Six" (110 hp (82 kW)) which dated to the early 1930s.

The 170 engine was upgraded to overhead valves (OHV) for 1961, gaining 22 hp (16 kW) in the process (up to 112 hp (84 kW)), enough of an improvement that Studebaker saw fit to finally discontinue the Big Six.

The new OHV six was a novel design, retaining as many existing components as possible while modernizing an engine that had been introduced in 1939. Unfortunately, the little engine's quality came into question early on, with a number of engines developing cracks in the cylinder head. The problem, which occurred most often in engines that had improperly-adjusted valves, was never completely solved, but with proper care, the 170 remains a serviceable engine for many owners more than 60 years after it went out of production.

From the start of production, those desiring V8 power could choose between Studebaker's 259- and 289 cuin engines with either a two- or four-barrel carburetor. Both engines remained largely unchanged during the truck's production run.

A wide variety of transmissions, both manual and automatic, were available in Champs. Base models came with a three-speed column shifted manual (AKA: 3 on the tree), with four- and five-speeds optional, as well as overdrive (with the three-speed). Studebaker's Flight-O-Matic (built by Borg-Warner) was the automatic option. This same transmission was used by other manufacturers, including Ford.

== 1960-1964 ==
Given the cobbled-up nature of the truck, sales were fairly good for the 1960 model year "5E" series. Unfortunately, it was all downhill from there.

1961's 6E series saw the addition of a full-width cargo box, the Spaceside, for which Studebaker had purchased the tooling from Dodge. It didn't help sales, however, nor did the problems which developed early on with the redesigned six-cylinder engine.

Very little was changed on the Champ in 1962 (7E series) Although a few changes were made on the 1963 8E series, the 8E series would include the few 1964 models that were built. New features introduced for the 8E trucks were suspended pedals (the pedals no longer went through the floorboard), new "2 stage" leaf springs in the rear, and an improved steering box for easier steering. Also, for the first-time air conditioning was an available option.

By December 1963, Studebaker's board of directors announced the closure of its South Bend, Indiana factory, and the trucks were among the casualties of the company's consolidation around an abbreviated family-car lineup in its Hamilton, Ontario, Canada assembly plant.

When they purchased the rights and tooling to the Studebaker Avanti in 1964, Nate Altman and Leo Newman also acquired the rights and tooling to Studebaker's trucks. However, Altman and Newman, for reasons which are lost to history, never built as much as a single truck, and the AM General truck and Hummer plant took over Studebaker's former Chippewa Avenue truck plant in South Bend for military production in late 1964. This plant is now used to store every stock Studebaker part that was left after the company's closing. A section of this plant is used as a store that sells parts to collectors and people taking on restorations.

== A pioneering truck ==
The Champ is seldom given credit for introducing a feature that is nearly universal among today's pickup trucks: the sliding rear window, which was available from the start, proved to be quite popular among Champ buyers. It was truly one of Studebaker's better ideas, and caught on later among the major truck makers.

With a cab based on a sedan body, the Champ was among the first pickups to offer true "car-like" comfort, with a wide, comfortable bench seat and a handsomely-styled interior. Other manufacturers took until the late 1960s and early 1970s to follow the Champ's lead.

Finally, the last Champs of 1963-64 were among the first American trucks — if not the first — to offer service bodies constructed of fiberglass. Today, such bodies made of fiberglass and composites are still gaining acceptance, with the steel service body remaining the norm.

While it didn't prove to be the savior of the Studebaker truck line, the Champ also pointed the way to a smaller yet still rugged pickup, something Dodge later claimed as a "first" with their mid-sized Dakota, which was introduced as a 1987 model, nearly 27 years after the Champ.

== Collector vehicles ==
Today, the Champs that still exist are highly prized for their interesting combination of passenger-car comfort and style and their rugged mechanical durability (the sixes' head problems notwithstanding). About the only major failing of the Champ is shared with many Studebaker models: rust. Champs tend to rust most severely in the cab floor and front fenders. If left unchecked, it can be extensive and very costly to repair, if it is repairable at all.
