= HMS Sceptre =

Five ships of the British Royal Navy have borne the name HMS Sceptre, after the sceptre, a symbol of royal authority.

- The first HMS Sceptre (1781), launched in 1781, was a 64-gun third-rate ship of the line. She was lost with 291 hands during a violent storm in Table Bay, near the Cape of Good Hope, when a series of anchor cables parted in the rising winds on 5 November 1799.
- The second HMS Sceptre (1802), launched in 1802, was a 74-gun third-rate ship of the line. In 1815, she was decommissioned at Chatham. Her final years were spent in the Channel blockade of the French before she was finally broken up in 1821.
- The third HMS Sceptre (1917), launched in 1917, was an R-class destroyer. She survived World War I and was sold for disposal in 1926.
- The fourth HMS Sceptre (P215), launched in 1943, was a 1940-programme S-class submarine. She served in World War II and was sold to BISCO for scrap in August 1949.
- The present HMS Sceptre (S104), launched in 1976, is a Swiftsure-class nuclear submarine.

== Battle honours ==
Ships named Sceptre have earned the following battle honours:

- Trincomalee, 1782
- Cape of Good Hope, 1795
- Guadeloupe, 1810
- Norway, 1944
- Atlantic, 1944
- Biscay, 1944

== See also ==
- French ship Sceptre
