= Rockne =

American automobile brand

Rockne Motors Corp.
- Industry: Automotive
- Founded: 1932; 94 years ago
- Defunct: 1933; 93 years ago
- Fate: Closed
- Headquarters: Detroit, Michigan, United States
- Key people: Knute Rockne, Albert Erskine, Ralph Vail, Roy Cole
- Products: Automobiles
- Production output: 30,293 (1932–1933)

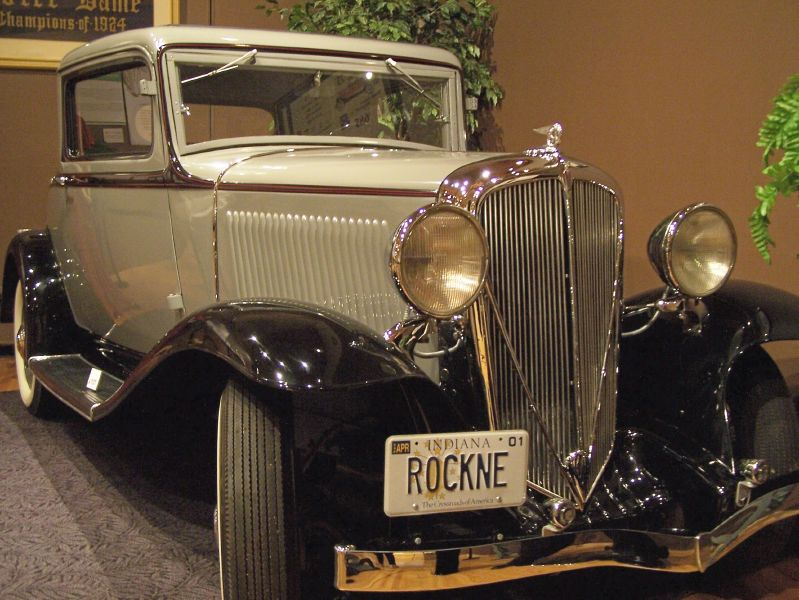
A Studebaker Rockne at the Studebaker National Museum in South Bend, Indiana

Rockne was an American automobile brand produced by the Studebaker Corporation of South Bend, Indiana, from 1932 to 1933. The brand was named for University of Notre Dame football coach Knute Rockne and the automobiles were produced in Detroit, Michigan.

== US production ==
Discussions between Studebaker and Knute Rockne began in 1928. Knute had for some time been appearing at dealer gatherings to give the same sort of pep talk he gave his teams at Notre Dame. He was offered a high-visibility job by Studebaker president Albert Erskine, and signed a contract to be their Manager of Sales Promotions in February 1931, perhaps planning to retire from coaching football. Erskine planned to end production of the company's lowest priced offering, his namesake Erskine automobile, which was slow-selling and unduly expensive for its compact stature.

When the Rockne prototype appeared, Erskine decided it would be a more than suitable replacement; larger, more powerful and quite attractive. There were two prototypes that some would consider 1931 Rocknes. In 1930, Ralph Vail and Roy Cole operated an engineering/consulting firm in Detroit. Willys-Overland commissioned them to design a new small six and paid them to build two prototype, a sedan and a coupe. Upon presenting the two vehicles to W-O the independent designers/engineers were told W-O was financially unable to take on another line and they could do what they wanted with the sedan and coupe, having already been paid. Vail stopped in South Bend and demonstrated the car to Albert Erskine, at that time president of the Studebaker Corporation. Erskine bought the design that day and both Vail and Cole would be brought into the Studebaker organization where they enjoyed long illustrious careers. The Rockne moniker was a later adoption so, technically, there were no 1931 Rocknes.

On March 31, 1931, 12 days after signing on as Manager of Sales Promotions, Knute Rockne was killed in an airplane crash. In September, 1931, George M. Graham, formerly of Willys-Overland, was named sales manager of the new Rockne Motor Corporation. Two models were approved for production, the "65" on 110 in (2,800 mm) wheelbase and the "75" on a 114 in (2,900 mm) wheelbase. The "75" was based on the Studebaker Six, while the "65" was entirely the design by Vail and Cole, under contract for Willys-Overland. The "75" was designed under Studebaker's head of engineering, Delmar "Barney" Roos.

Production of the Rockne "75" began at South Bend on December 15, 1931. The smaller "65" went into production at the old E-M-F plant on Piquette Avenue in Detroit, February 22, 1932. This was the same plant at which the 1927 and 1928 Erskine models had been built. The Rockne also went into production at Studebaker's Canadian plant at Walkerville, Ontario, near Windsor.

In 1933 the Rockne offering was reduced to just one line, the Model "10". The Rockne "10" was an update of the "65". When Studebaker went into receivership on March 18, 1933, it was decided to move production of the Rockne "10" to the Studebaker plant in South Bend. The Rockne "10" was built in South Bend from April through July, 1933.

The Rockne "65/10" engine engineered by Vail and Cole would replace all the six-cylinder Studebaker car engines then in production and power Studebaker Dictator and Commander cars until World War II. This engine would also power postwar Commanders and Land Cruisers until the V8 became available for 1951. This engine would also be the larger of two six cylinder engines offered in trucks through 1960.

== Rockne abroad ==
Rockne was assembled at Studebaker's Canadian plant across the Detroit River at Walkerville, Ontario.

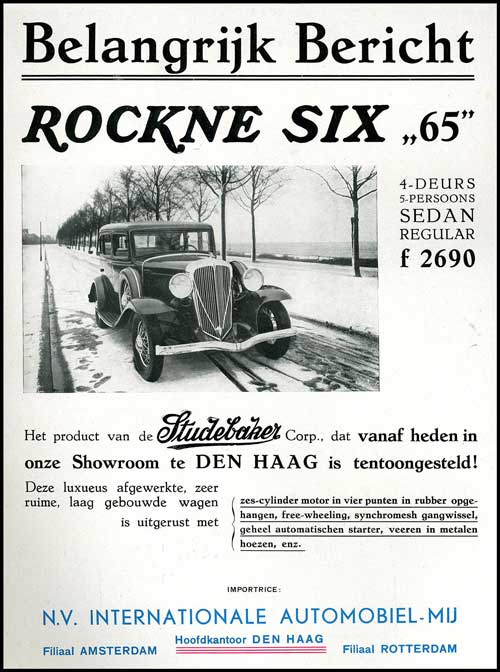
1932 Rockne advertisement in Rotterdam

There was a small assembly production of Rockne in The Netherlands in 1932 and 1933.

Norway: About 90 Rockne 65 and 75 were assembled by A/S Skabo Jernbanevognfabrik.

Denmark: A small, unknown number of Rockne 65 was assembled in Copenhagen by De Forenede Automobilfabrikker A/S.

== Literature ==
- Maloney, James H. (1994). Studebaker Cars. Crestline Books. ISBN 0-87938-884-6.
- Langworth, Richard (1979). Studebaker, the Postwar Years. Motorbooks International. ISBN 0-87938-058-6.
- Kimes, Beverly R. (1996). Clark, Henry A. (ed.). The Standard Catalog of American Cars 1805–1945. Kraus Publications. ISBN 0-87341-428-4.
- Cannon, William A.; Fox, Fred K. (1981). Studebaker: The Complete History. TAB Books, Inc. ISBN 0-8306-2064-8.
- Antique Studebaker Review, Volume 3, Number 4, November, 1973
- Bertheau, Øistein/Stokke, Christian: Made in Norway? Historien om forsøk på bilproduksjon i Norge, Norsk teknisk Museum 1991 ISBN 82-90115-24-5 (in Norwegian)
- Karsholt, Erich: Dansk Bilproduktion. Bil- og samlefabrikker i det 20. århundrede, Strandbergs forlag 2020 ISBN 978-87-7717-232-8 (in Danish)
