= Studebaker Scotsman =

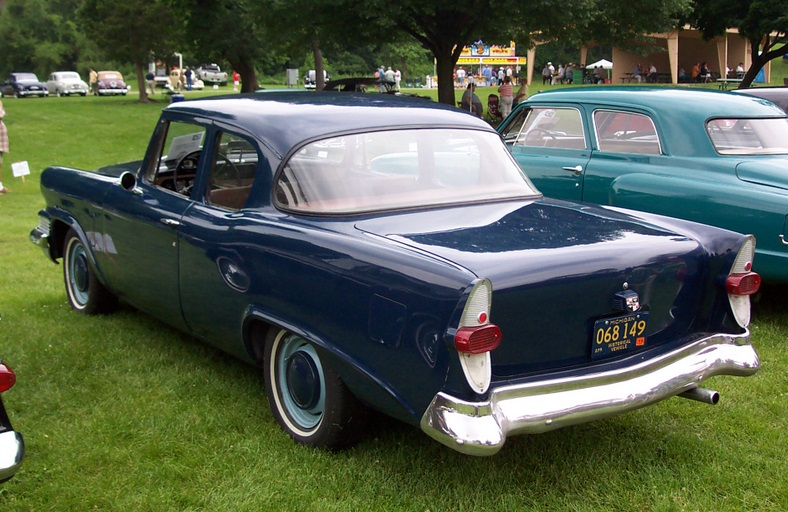
- 1957 Scotsman 4-door sedan

Overview
- Production: 1957–1958
- Assembly: Studebaker Automotive Plant, South Bend, Indiana, United States

Body and chassis
- Class: Mid-size car
- Body style: 2-door sedan 4-door sedan 2-door station wagon
- Layout: FR layout
- Related: Studebaker Champion

Powertrain
- Engine: 185 cu in (3.0 L) L-head I6; 289 cu in (4.7 L) OHV V8

Dimensions
- Wheelbase: sedans & station wagons: 116.5 in (2,959 mm)
- Length: sedans & station wagons: 202.4 in (5,141 mm)
- Width: sedans & station wagons: 75.8 in (1,925 mm)

Chronology
- Successor: Studebaker Lark

The Scotsman is an automobile series that was produced by the Studebaker Packard Corporation of South Bend, Indiana, during the 1957 and 1958 model years, and a low-priced series of pickup trucks in 1958 and 1959. The name was based on the reputation of Scottish frugality, the cars being built for function and minimalism.

== Car and wagon ==
When Studebaker-Packard's financial situation worsened in 1955 and 1956, company leaders decided, rather than meet the "Big Three" automakers head-on, to compete with low-priced, basic transportation. Using the Studebaker Champion's two- and four-door sedan and two-door station-wagon bodies, the company created a vehicle which could undercut the prices of minimal-frill competitors the Chevrolet 150, Ford Custom and Plymouth Plaza. The Scotsman had features reminiscent of the "blackout" cars of the shortened 1942 model year, from which chrome trim was eliminated by war-materials rationing, though such refinements have been added by latter-day enthusiasts.

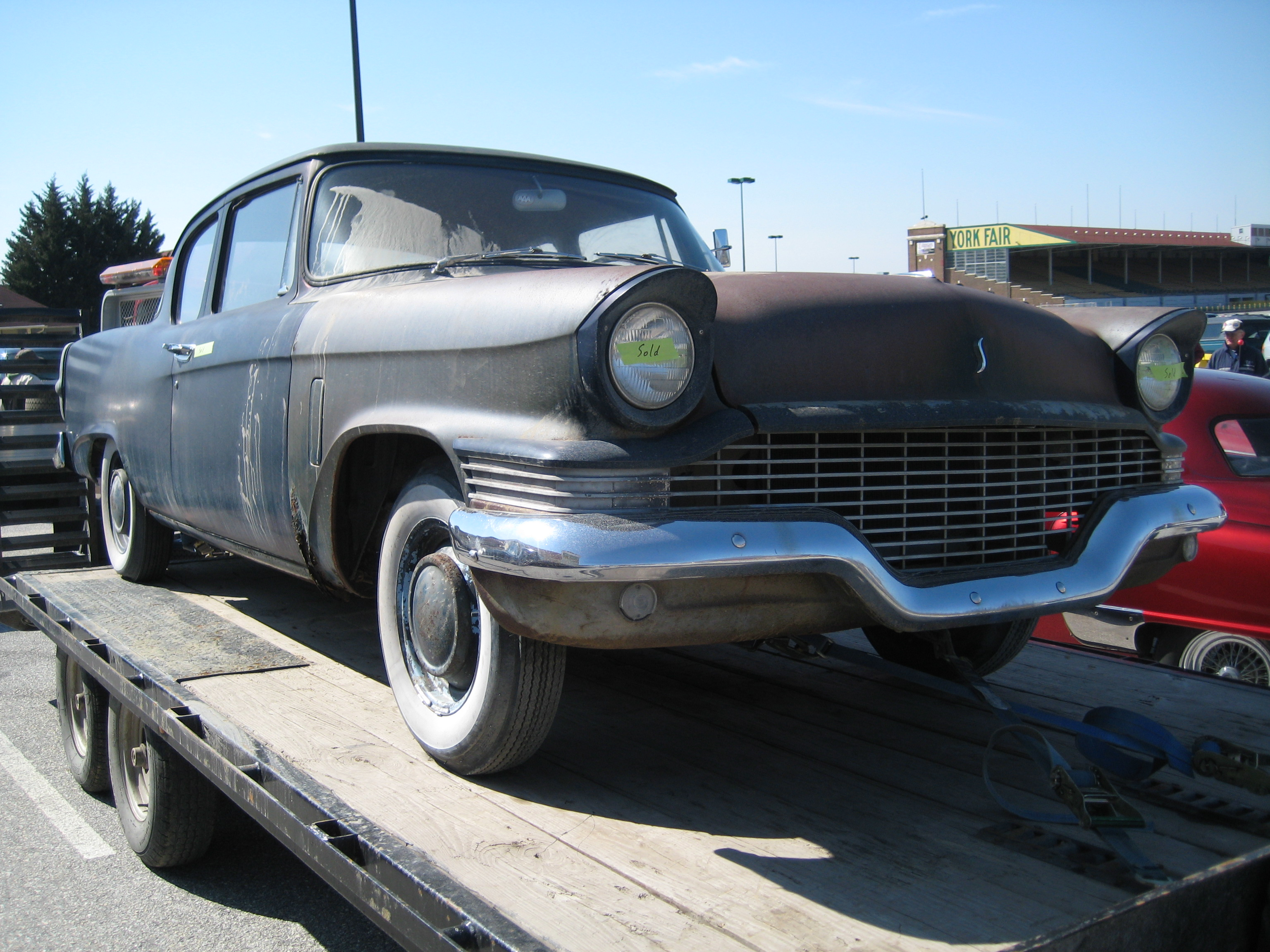

Hubcaps and grille were painted; buyers paid extra for a basic recirculating heater for the passenger compartment. Interiors were fitted with painted cardboard panels—gray vinyl being the single standard for upholstery. Rubberized floor coverings replaced carpeting. The only chrome plating was on the front and rear bumpers and some minor interior parts. Painted bumpers were an option to reduce the cost of the car even further. On two-door models, the rear windows were fixed without winders. Standard windshield wipers were vacuum-powered, resulting in reduced performance as engine load increased. The only apparent frill was Studebaker's heavily promoted "Cyclops Eye" speedometer, the same as that used on the 1956 Studebakers. Dealers were instructed to avoid installing extra-cost accessories, on the rationale that a buyer who wanted frills on an economical car could buy a regular Champion for an extra $200 (equal to $2,293 today).

Priced below the competition from $1,776 (equal to $20,359 today) for the two-door sedan, Scotsman sales were projected at 4,000 cars for the short 1957 model year. In fact, over 9,000 were sold. One notable owner of a Scotsman was First Lady Eleanor Roosevelt. The small six-cylinder engine delivered a claimed 30 mpg_{‑US} (7.8 L/100 km; 36 mpg_{‑imp}) of gasoline when the overdrive transmission was chosen. With 101 hp (75 kW), the Scotsman took about 20 seconds to reach 60 mph (97 km/h) from rest, at a time when 10-second 0-60 mph times were becoming more common, even among the low-priced field.

Following up on the initial success of the first Scotsman, the 1958 models were little changed. A slightly altered grille and round taillamp lenses were adopted, which allowed the company to keep prices as low as possible. Although the 1958 Champion received added-on tailfins in the back and fender-mounted pods up front to accept four headlamps (two per side) as was the trend in '58, the Scotsman remained finless in the rear and kept the two headlamp system. Promotional materials now referred to the "Studebaker Scotsman" rather than "Studebaker Champion Scotsman", a promotion of sorts from a sub-series to a model in its own right.

In a push to increase fleet sales, Studebaker also offered the Econ-o-miler in 1958, based on the body of the 120.5 in (3,060 mm) wheelbase President sedan. The Econ-o-miler used the Scotsman's frugal exterior and interior elements and was pushed as a taxi model. In addition, Studebaker's police-package cars in 1958 were often Scotsmans with Commander and President V-8 engines.

The Scotsman continued its success in 1958, outselling the Champion, Commander and President lines combined. The Scotsman proved that Studebaker need not attempt to follow the styling trends of the rest of the industry. Building on the Scotsman's clean-lined look, Studebaker engineers and designers quickly and cheaply created a new compact car for 1959, the Lark, not as austere as the Scotsman, but able to seat six adults in a package markedly different from its competitors at the time.

== Pickup truck ==
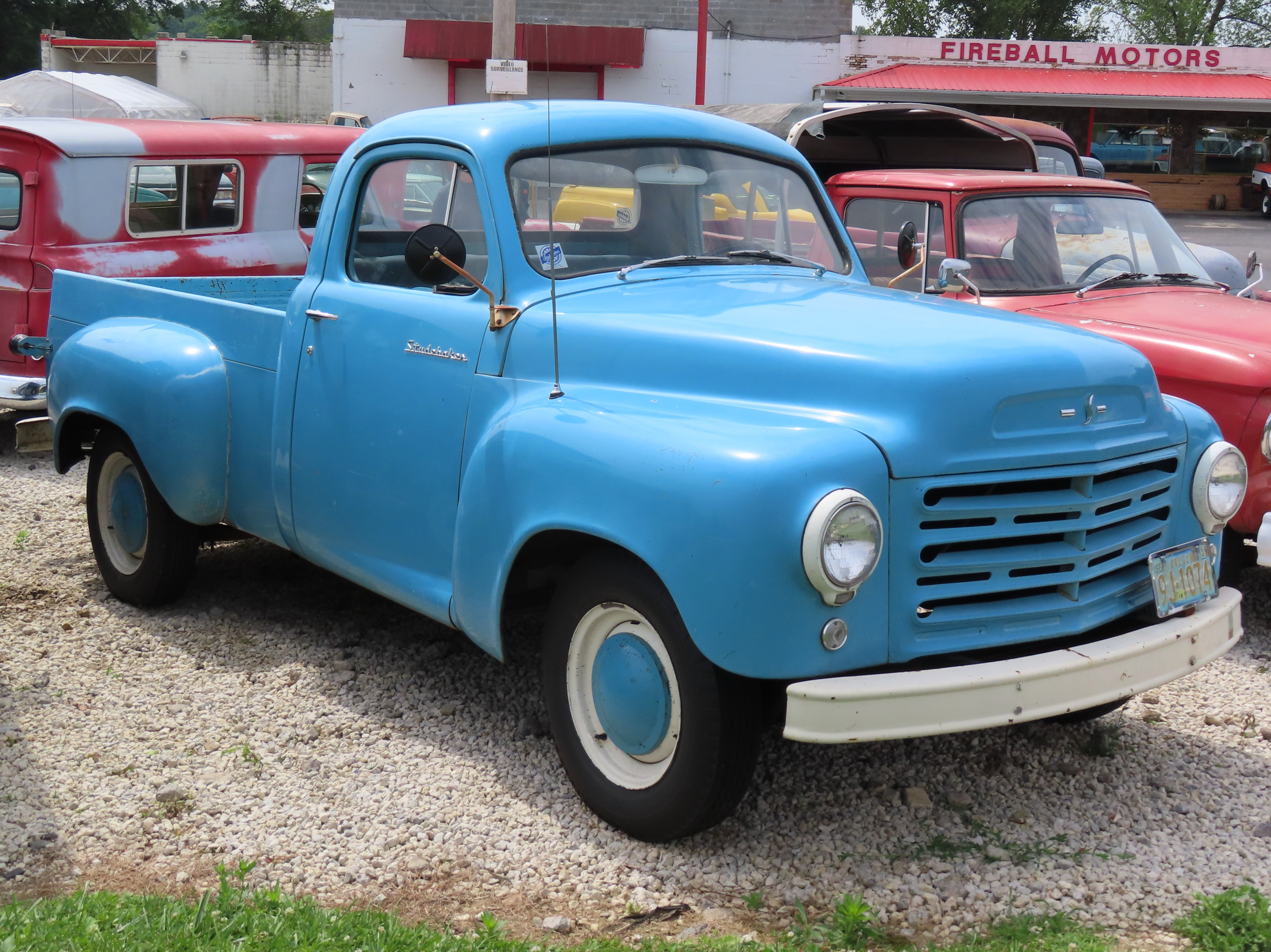
1959 Studebaker Scotsman truck

To serve a target market for a low-priced, basic pickup truck, Studebaker produced a Scotsman truck based on the lines of the 1949-53 style of grille and front-end sheetmetal, with a few modifications. Most trucks in the 1950s had as standard one tail-lamp, one interior sun visor, one windshield wiper, and one arm-rest—all on the driver's side. The Scotsman followed this philosophy with one exception: there was no arm-rest. Externally, the Scotsman had simple plaid decals and no chrome trim.

Stripping to a more basic level allowed Studebaker to advertise the lowest-priced pickup in the U.S. in 1958; it cost less than $1,500 to drive home a standard Scotsman pickup. The model sold reasonably well, though the general car and truck market was down in 1958.

The Scotsman truck, unlike the car, was continued in 1959, exchanging its plaid decal nameplates for chromed "S" and "Studebaker" emblems. An inexpensive "Deluxe Equipment Group" enabled buyers to fit their Scotsmans with the same grille and front sheetmetal as the regular Studebaker trucks. Two new models were added as well, although these were comprised simply of additional engines from which to choose. More pickups were sold than the standard "Deluxe" line.

The Scotsman was replaced for the 1960 model year by the Studebaker Champ pickup, which was based on the same truck chassis but with a cab derived from the contemporary Lark four-door sedan.
