= Studebaker Canada =

Defunct Canadian automobile manufacturer

Studebaker of Canada Ltd. was the name given to Studebaker Corporation's Canadian manufacturing arm.

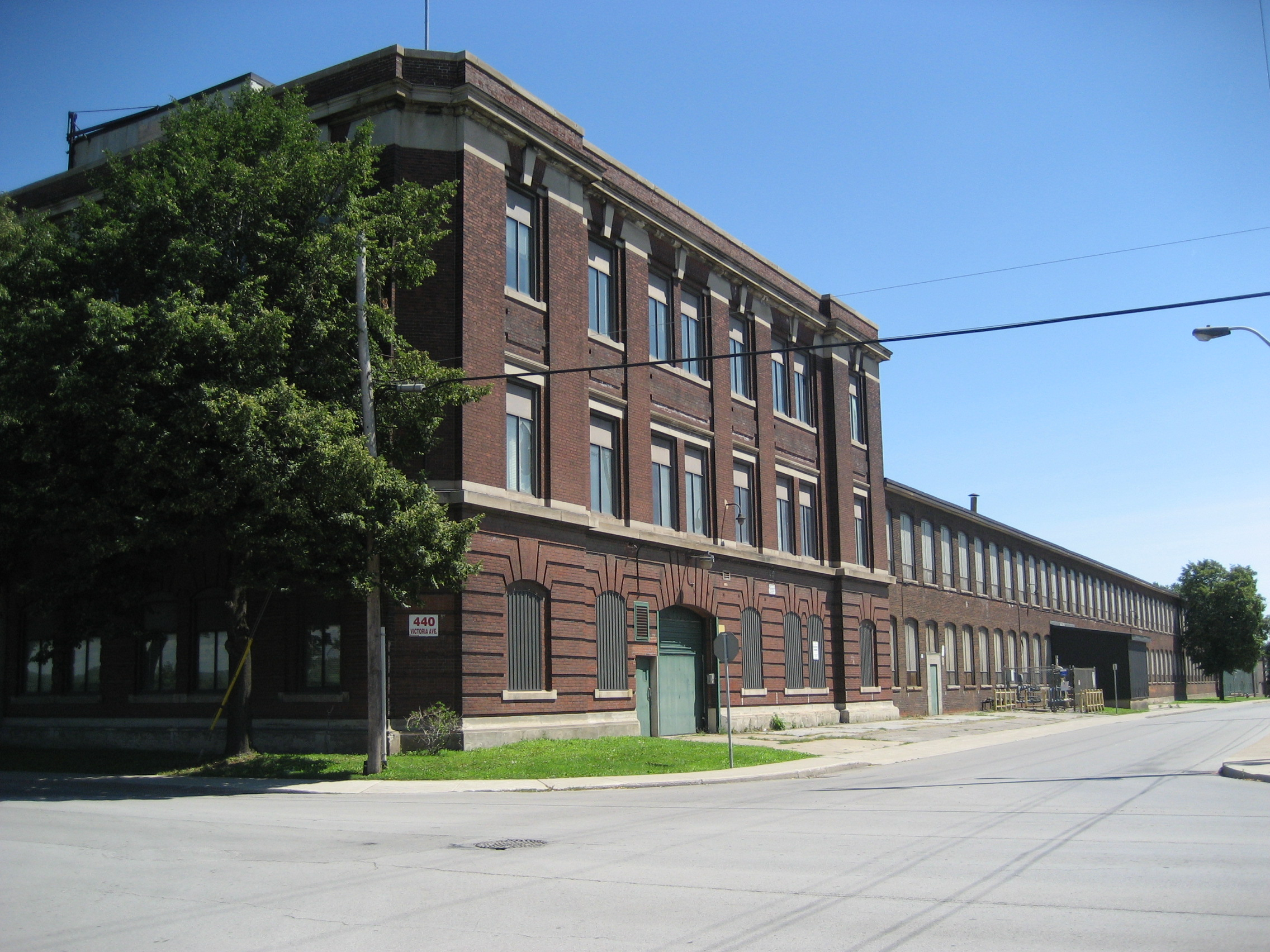
Old Otis Elevator/ Studebaker (and Allan Candy) plant building on Victoria Avenue North

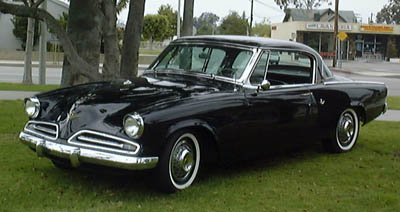
1953 Studebaker Commander Starliner, showing the streamlined design of the 1950s Studebaker.

== History ==
While Studebaker produced cars in Canada prior to the Second World War, Studebaker's first modern automobile factory was established at Hamilton, Ontario in 1947, in an anti-aircraft gun plant purchased from the Canadian government. From its opening until December 1963, the Hamilton plant manufactured automobiles as a satellite facility using engines produced in the United States. Studebaker half-ton pickup trucks were assembled at Hamilton, Ontario, from 1950 through 1955.

Studebaker of Canada and Packard Motor Company of Canada merged in 1954. Packard had ceased Canadian assembly operations in 1939, and the Canadian affiliate was a distribution and administrative organization. Although the 1957 and 1958 Packards were based on Studebaker models, none were assembled in Canada.

On October 28, 1962, Studebaker of Canada acquired the rights to import and market Mercedes-Benz and DKW automobiles in Canada. As in the United States, the Mercedes-Benz line was not sold by all Studebaker dealers as each dealer had to prove they had the resources to market a car in that price class. Studebaker of Canada ended its connection with Mercedes-Benz in 1965.

During the 1963 model year, Studebaker of Canada made some changes to its product mix. In mid-year the Canadian plant began assembly of the Daytona convertible and the Cruiser sedan, both imported to that point. The Studebaker Avanti was never built in Canada and the Canadian firm never offered the mid-1963 Standard series to Canadians. When the 1963 model year came to an end, the Studebaker Gran Turismo Hawk became an imported vehicle.

Following the closure of the South Bend, Indiana factory in late December 1963, Studebaker shifted all of its production to Hamilton, where it was felt the company could be profitable on production of around 20,000 units a year. Because of limited plant capacity, the decision was made to focus on the Daytona, Cruiser, Commander and Wagonaire, which were all Lark-type platform variants. Studebaker would not shift production of the Hawk, Avanti and truck series to Canada.

For the remainder of the 1964 model year, engines continued to be built in South Bend (until the expiration of union contracts at year end), but without casting capabilities in Hamilton, the company shifted to small block Chevrolet V8 and I6 engines for the 1965 model year. The engines were produced by McKinnon Industries, a GM subsidiary located in nearby St. Catharines.

== Importer status ==
During this period, Studebaker of Canada also imported cars for Volkswagen of Canada, using its status as a Canadian manufacturer to take advantage of lower import duties than a Canadian importer. Studebaker was able to import Volkswagens from Germany and sell them to Volkswagen of Canada at a lower cost to Volkswagen and Studebaker was still able to make $150 on each car imported.

Studebaker of Canada also attempted to import Datsun cars to North America. It was felt a second vehicle for Studebaker dealers would help increase showroom traffic and sales, and that one of Datsun's larger models could serve as a Studebaker-badged replacement for its own aging design. Studebaker of Canada president, Gordon Grundy, flew to Japan to meet with the heads of Nissan, makers of the Datsun. All was going well when management in South Bend ordered Grundy to break off talks with Nissan and approach Toyota instead. Toyota refused to speak with Grundy as he had not approached them first, and Nissan would not reopen discussions. The decision to change talks in mid-stream was the result of a suggestion from a member of the head office's legal firm (reputedly Richard Nixon), who felt Toyota would be a better choice. In the end, Studebaker had no imported car for its dealers from either manufacturer.

== Marketing and the end of production ==
Studebaker cars built in Canada were openly marketed there as Studebaker: Canada's Own Car!. In other markets, notably the United States, Studebaker promoted the Common Sense Car. Production of Studebaker cars in Canada increased in 1964 due to the American plant closure, but American sales collapsed. During 1965, even Canadian sales began to decline, both a sign the future was not rosy. Although the 1965 production of 19,435 cars met the announced goal, the reality was that the move to Canada was more a method of gradually phasing out production, rather than a real effort to remain in the auto business.

Grundy approached management in early 1966 seeking funds for a minor 1967 restyle and the associated tooling, but was advised that there would be no 1967 models. The last of the 8,947 1966 models built, and the final Studebaker car, a V8-powered Cruiser four-door sedan, rolled off the Hamilton assembly line on March 16, 1966. Now fully restored, it is on display at the Studebaker National Museum in South Bend, Indiana.

== End of the line ==
On August 18, 1948, surrounded by more than 400 employees and a battery of reporters, the first vehicle, a blue Champion four-door sedan, rolled off the Studebaker assembly line. The company was located in the former Otis-Fenson military weapons factory off Burlington Street East, which was built in 1941. The Indiana-based Studebaker was looking for a Canadian site and settled on Hamilton because of its steel industry. The company was known for making automotive innovations and building solid distinctive cars. 1950 was its best year but the descent was quick. By 1954, Studebaker was in the red and merging with Packard, another falling car manufacturer. In 1963, the company moved its entire car operations to Hamilton. The Canadian car side had always been a money-maker and Studebaker was looking to curtail disastrous losses. That took the plant from a single to double shift - 48 to 96 cars daily. The last car to roll off the line was a turquoise Lark Cruiser on March 17, 1966. Studebaker officially shut down the next day. It was terrible news for the 700 workers who had formed a true family at the company, known for its employee parties and day trips. It was a huge blow to the city, too. Studebaker was Hamilton's 10th largest employer at the time.

The old Studebaker plant was later re-acquired by Otis Elevators, which used the building until 1987. It was scheduled for demolition in 2012 to make way for a new industrial estate.
